

507001–507100 

|-bgcolor=#E9E9E9
| 507001 ||  || — || October 1, 2008 || Kitt Peak || Spacewatch ||  || align=right | 1.3 km || 
|-id=002 bgcolor=#E9E9E9
| 507002 ||  || — || October 2, 2008 || Kitt Peak || Spacewatch ||  || align=right | 1.4 km || 
|-id=003 bgcolor=#E9E9E9
| 507003 ||  || — || September 2, 2008 || Kitt Peak || Spacewatch ||  || align=right | 1.1 km || 
|-id=004 bgcolor=#E9E9E9
| 507004 ||  || — || September 6, 2008 || Kitt Peak || Spacewatch || MIS || align=right | 2.0 km || 
|-id=005 bgcolor=#E9E9E9
| 507005 ||  || — || October 5, 2008 || La Sagra || OAM Obs. ||  || align=right | 1.3 km || 
|-id=006 bgcolor=#E9E9E9
| 507006 ||  || — || October 6, 2008 || Kitt Peak || Spacewatch ||  || align=right | 1.5 km || 
|-id=007 bgcolor=#E9E9E9
| 507007 ||  || — || October 6, 2008 || Kitt Peak || Spacewatch ||  || align=right | 1.2 km || 
|-id=008 bgcolor=#E9E9E9
| 507008 ||  || — || October 9, 2008 || Mount Lemmon || Mount Lemmon Survey ||  || align=right | 1.2 km || 
|-id=009 bgcolor=#E9E9E9
| 507009 ||  || — || September 6, 2008 || Siding Spring || SSS ||  || align=right | 1.9 km || 
|-id=010 bgcolor=#E9E9E9
| 507010 ||  || — || September 29, 2008 || Socorro || LINEAR ||  || align=right | 1.3 km || 
|-id=011 bgcolor=#E9E9E9
| 507011 ||  || — || October 1, 2008 || Catalina || CSS ||  || align=right | 2.5 km || 
|-id=012 bgcolor=#E9E9E9
| 507012 ||  || — || October 2, 2008 || Kitt Peak || Spacewatch ||  || align=right | 1.4 km || 
|-id=013 bgcolor=#d6d6d6
| 507013 ||  || — || October 3, 2008 || Kitt Peak || Spacewatch || 3:2 || align=right | 4.6 km || 
|-id=014 bgcolor=#E9E9E9
| 507014 ||  || — || October 1, 2008 || Kitt Peak || Spacewatch ||  || align=right | 1.7 km || 
|-id=015 bgcolor=#E9E9E9
| 507015 ||  || — || October 10, 2008 || Mount Lemmon || Mount Lemmon Survey ||  || align=right | 1.9 km || 
|-id=016 bgcolor=#E9E9E9
| 507016 ||  || — || September 8, 2008 || Catalina || CSS || JUN || align=right | 1.1 km || 
|-id=017 bgcolor=#E9E9E9
| 507017 ||  || — || September 25, 2008 || Kitt Peak || Spacewatch || AGN || align=right | 1.2 km || 
|-id=018 bgcolor=#E9E9E9
| 507018 ||  || — || October 20, 2008 || Kitt Peak || Spacewatch ||  || align=right | 1.4 km || 
|-id=019 bgcolor=#E9E9E9
| 507019 ||  || — || October 20, 2008 || Kitt Peak || Spacewatch ||  || align=right | 1.9 km || 
|-id=020 bgcolor=#E9E9E9
| 507020 ||  || — || October 7, 1999 || Kitt Peak || Spacewatch ||  || align=right | 1.6 km || 
|-id=021 bgcolor=#E9E9E9
| 507021 ||  || — || October 21, 2008 || Mount Lemmon || Mount Lemmon Survey ||  || align=right | 2.1 km || 
|-id=022 bgcolor=#E9E9E9
| 507022 ||  || — || October 21, 2008 || Kitt Peak || Spacewatch ||  || align=right | 2.3 km || 
|-id=023 bgcolor=#E9E9E9
| 507023 ||  || — || October 21, 2008 || Kitt Peak || Spacewatch ||  || align=right | 1.8 km || 
|-id=024 bgcolor=#E9E9E9
| 507024 ||  || — || October 21, 2008 || Mount Lemmon || Mount Lemmon Survey || HNS || align=right | 1.1 km || 
|-id=025 bgcolor=#E9E9E9
| 507025 ||  || — || October 9, 2008 || Kitt Peak || Spacewatch ||  || align=right | 1.3 km || 
|-id=026 bgcolor=#E9E9E9
| 507026 ||  || — || September 9, 2008 || Mount Lemmon || Mount Lemmon Survey ||  || align=right | 1.1 km || 
|-id=027 bgcolor=#E9E9E9
| 507027 ||  || — || October 25, 2008 || Socorro || LINEAR ||  || align=right | 2.7 km || 
|-id=028 bgcolor=#E9E9E9
| 507028 ||  || — || September 23, 2008 || Kitt Peak || Spacewatch ||  || align=right | 1.1 km || 
|-id=029 bgcolor=#E9E9E9
| 507029 ||  || — || October 20, 2008 || Kitt Peak || Spacewatch ||  || align=right | 1.2 km || 
|-id=030 bgcolor=#E9E9E9
| 507030 ||  || — || October 22, 2008 || Kitt Peak || Spacewatch ||  || align=right | 1.7 km || 
|-id=031 bgcolor=#E9E9E9
| 507031 ||  || — || October 22, 2008 || Kitt Peak || Spacewatch ||  || align=right | 1.8 km || 
|-id=032 bgcolor=#E9E9E9
| 507032 ||  || — || October 23, 2008 || Kitt Peak || Spacewatch ||  || align=right | 1.2 km || 
|-id=033 bgcolor=#E9E9E9
| 507033 ||  || — || October 23, 2008 || Kitt Peak || Spacewatch ||  || align=right | 1.4 km || 
|-id=034 bgcolor=#E9E9E9
| 507034 ||  || — || October 23, 2008 || Kitt Peak || Spacewatch ||  || align=right | 2.0 km || 
|-id=035 bgcolor=#E9E9E9
| 507035 ||  || — || October 2, 2008 || Kitt Peak || Spacewatch ||  || align=right | 1.2 km || 
|-id=036 bgcolor=#E9E9E9
| 507036 ||  || — || October 23, 2008 || Mount Lemmon || Mount Lemmon Survey ||  || align=right | 1.9 km || 
|-id=037 bgcolor=#E9E9E9
| 507037 ||  || — || October 24, 2008 || Kitt Peak || Spacewatch ||  || align=right | 1.9 km || 
|-id=038 bgcolor=#E9E9E9
| 507038 ||  || — || September 22, 2008 || Kitt Peak || Spacewatch ||  || align=right | 1.3 km || 
|-id=039 bgcolor=#E9E9E9
| 507039 ||  || — || September 24, 2008 || Mount Lemmon || Mount Lemmon Survey ||  || align=right | 1.2 km || 
|-id=040 bgcolor=#E9E9E9
| 507040 ||  || — || September 23, 2008 || Mount Lemmon || Mount Lemmon Survey ||  || align=right | 1.3 km || 
|-id=041 bgcolor=#E9E9E9
| 507041 ||  || — || October 25, 2008 || Kitt Peak || Spacewatch ||  || align=right | 1.8 km || 
|-id=042 bgcolor=#E9E9E9
| 507042 ||  || — || October 25, 2008 || Kitt Peak || Spacewatch ||  || align=right | 2.3 km || 
|-id=043 bgcolor=#E9E9E9
| 507043 ||  || — || October 26, 2008 || Kitt Peak || Spacewatch ||  || align=right | 1.8 km || 
|-id=044 bgcolor=#E9E9E9
| 507044 ||  || — || October 27, 2008 || Kitt Peak || Spacewatch ||  || align=right | 1.5 km || 
|-id=045 bgcolor=#E9E9E9
| 507045 ||  || — || October 23, 2008 || Kitt Peak || Spacewatch ||  || align=right | 2.0 km || 
|-id=046 bgcolor=#E9E9E9
| 507046 ||  || — || October 29, 2008 || Kitt Peak || Spacewatch || GEF || align=right data-sort-value="0.79" | 790 m || 
|-id=047 bgcolor=#E9E9E9
| 507047 ||  || — || October 2, 2008 || Kitt Peak || Spacewatch ||  || align=right | 1.4 km || 
|-id=048 bgcolor=#E9E9E9
| 507048 ||  || — || October 29, 2008 || Kitt Peak || Spacewatch ||  || align=right | 1.5 km || 
|-id=049 bgcolor=#E9E9E9
| 507049 ||  || — || October 8, 2008 || Catalina || CSS ||  || align=right | 1.5 km || 
|-id=050 bgcolor=#E9E9E9
| 507050 ||  || — || October 30, 2008 || Mount Lemmon || Mount Lemmon Survey || NEM || align=right | 1.8 km || 
|-id=051 bgcolor=#E9E9E9
| 507051 ||  || — || October 21, 2008 || Kitt Peak || Spacewatch ||  || align=right | 1.6 km || 
|-id=052 bgcolor=#E9E9E9
| 507052 ||  || — || October 26, 2008 || Mount Lemmon || Mount Lemmon Survey || AEO || align=right data-sort-value="0.88" | 880 m || 
|-id=053 bgcolor=#E9E9E9
| 507053 ||  || — || October 27, 2008 || Siding Spring || SSS ||  || align=right | 2.1 km || 
|-id=054 bgcolor=#E9E9E9
| 507054 ||  || — || October 6, 2008 || Mount Lemmon || Mount Lemmon Survey ||  || align=right | 1.3 km || 
|-id=055 bgcolor=#E9E9E9
| 507055 ||  || — || October 6, 2008 || Mount Lemmon || Mount Lemmon Survey ||  || align=right | 1.9 km || 
|-id=056 bgcolor=#E9E9E9
| 507056 ||  || — || October 31, 2008 || Mount Lemmon || Mount Lemmon Survey ||  || align=right | 1.6 km || 
|-id=057 bgcolor=#E9E9E9
| 507057 ||  || — || November 3, 2008 || Kitt Peak || Spacewatch ||  || align=right | 2.0 km || 
|-id=058 bgcolor=#E9E9E9
| 507058 ||  || — || October 27, 2008 || Kitt Peak || Spacewatch ||  || align=right | 1.4 km || 
|-id=059 bgcolor=#E9E9E9
| 507059 ||  || — || November 6, 2008 || Kitt Peak || Spacewatch ||  || align=right | 1.8 km || 
|-id=060 bgcolor=#E9E9E9
| 507060 ||  || — || September 7, 2008 || Mount Lemmon || Mount Lemmon Survey ||  || align=right | 1.3 km || 
|-id=061 bgcolor=#E9E9E9
| 507061 ||  || — || October 24, 2008 || Mount Lemmon || Mount Lemmon Survey ||  || align=right | 1.1 km || 
|-id=062 bgcolor=#E9E9E9
| 507062 ||  || — || November 17, 2008 || Kitt Peak || Spacewatch ||  || align=right | 1.6 km || 
|-id=063 bgcolor=#E9E9E9
| 507063 ||  || — || November 7, 2008 || Mount Lemmon || Mount Lemmon Survey ||  || align=right | 2.0 km || 
|-id=064 bgcolor=#E9E9E9
| 507064 ||  || — || November 20, 2008 || Kitt Peak || Spacewatch ||  || align=right | 1.6 km || 
|-id=065 bgcolor=#E9E9E9
| 507065 ||  || — || October 24, 2008 || Kitt Peak || Spacewatch ||  || align=right | 1.7 km || 
|-id=066 bgcolor=#E9E9E9
| 507066 ||  || — || November 27, 2008 || Črni Vrh || Črni Vrh || (1547) || align=right | 1.6 km || 
|-id=067 bgcolor=#E9E9E9
| 507067 ||  || — || October 23, 2008 || Kitt Peak || Spacewatch || MRX || align=right data-sort-value="0.85" | 850 m || 
|-id=068 bgcolor=#E9E9E9
| 507068 ||  || — || October 30, 2008 || Kitt Peak || Spacewatch || AEO || align=right | 1.0 km || 
|-id=069 bgcolor=#E9E9E9
| 507069 ||  || — || October 23, 2008 || Kitt Peak || Spacewatch ||  || align=right | 1.7 km || 
|-id=070 bgcolor=#E9E9E9
| 507070 ||  || — || December 1, 2008 || Kitt Peak || Spacewatch ||  || align=right | 1.6 km || 
|-id=071 bgcolor=#E9E9E9
| 507071 ||  || — || October 25, 2008 || Kitt Peak || Spacewatch ||  || align=right | 1.6 km || 
|-id=072 bgcolor=#E9E9E9
| 507072 ||  || — || November 20, 2008 || Kitt Peak || Spacewatch ||  || align=right | 1.4 km || 
|-id=073 bgcolor=#E9E9E9
| 507073 ||  || — || December 4, 2008 || Mount Lemmon || Mount Lemmon Survey ||  || align=right | 1.3 km || 
|-id=074 bgcolor=#E9E9E9
| 507074 ||  || — || November 7, 2008 || Mount Lemmon || Mount Lemmon Survey ||  || align=right | 1.8 km || 
|-id=075 bgcolor=#E9E9E9
| 507075 ||  || — || December 29, 2008 || Kitt Peak || Spacewatch ||  || align=right | 1.8 km || 
|-id=076 bgcolor=#E9E9E9
| 507076 ||  || — || November 19, 2008 || Kitt Peak || Spacewatch ||  || align=right | 1.6 km || 
|-id=077 bgcolor=#d6d6d6
| 507077 ||  || — || September 9, 2007 || Mount Lemmon || Mount Lemmon Survey ||  || align=right | 1.8 km || 
|-id=078 bgcolor=#fefefe
| 507078 ||  || — || December 21, 2008 || Kitt Peak || Spacewatch ||  || align=right data-sort-value="0.65" | 650 m || 
|-id=079 bgcolor=#E9E9E9
| 507079 ||  || — || December 22, 2008 || Mount Lemmon || Mount Lemmon Survey ||  || align=right | 1.6 km || 
|-id=080 bgcolor=#E9E9E9
| 507080 ||  || — || October 17, 2008 || Kitt Peak || Spacewatch ||  || align=right | 2.5 km || 
|-id=081 bgcolor=#d6d6d6
| 507081 ||  || — || January 2, 2009 || Mount Lemmon || Mount Lemmon Survey || KOR || align=right | 1.0 km || 
|-id=082 bgcolor=#fefefe
| 507082 ||  || — || January 16, 2009 || Kitt Peak || Spacewatch ||  || align=right data-sort-value="0.51" | 510 m || 
|-id=083 bgcolor=#d6d6d6
| 507083 ||  || — || January 18, 2009 || Kitt Peak || Spacewatch ||  || align=right | 2.9 km || 
|-id=084 bgcolor=#E9E9E9
| 507084 ||  || — || January 20, 2009 || Catalina || CSS ||  || align=right | 1.6 km || 
|-id=085 bgcolor=#d6d6d6
| 507085 ||  || — || December 31, 2008 || Mount Lemmon || Mount Lemmon Survey ||  || align=right | 2.1 km || 
|-id=086 bgcolor=#d6d6d6
| 507086 ||  || — || February 22, 2009 || Kitt Peak || Spacewatch ||  || align=right | 2.5 km || 
|-id=087 bgcolor=#fefefe
| 507087 ||  || — || February 26, 2009 || Kitt Peak || Spacewatch ||  || align=right data-sort-value="0.60" | 600 m || 
|-id=088 bgcolor=#fefefe
| 507088 ||  || — || February 26, 2009 || Kitt Peak || Spacewatch ||  || align=right data-sort-value="0.71" | 710 m || 
|-id=089 bgcolor=#E9E9E9
| 507089 ||  || — || December 5, 2008 || Kitt Peak || Spacewatch ||  || align=right | 2.4 km || 
|-id=090 bgcolor=#E9E9E9
| 507090 ||  || — || February 20, 2009 || Catalina || CSS ||  || align=right | 2.4 km || 
|-id=091 bgcolor=#d6d6d6
| 507091 ||  || — || March 15, 2009 || Kitt Peak || Spacewatch ||  || align=right | 2.2 km || 
|-id=092 bgcolor=#fefefe
| 507092 ||  || — || February 28, 2009 || Kitt Peak || Spacewatch ||  || align=right data-sort-value="0.79" | 790 m || 
|-id=093 bgcolor=#d6d6d6
| 507093 ||  || — || March 18, 2009 || Mount Lemmon || Mount Lemmon Survey || KOR || align=right data-sort-value="0.99" | 990 m || 
|-id=094 bgcolor=#d6d6d6
| 507094 ||  || — || March 17, 2009 || La Sagra || OAM Obs. ||  || align=right | 3.0 km || 
|-id=095 bgcolor=#fefefe
| 507095 ||  || — || March 1, 2009 || Kitt Peak || Spacewatch ||  || align=right data-sort-value="0.64" | 640 m || 
|-id=096 bgcolor=#fefefe
| 507096 ||  || — || March 31, 2009 || Mount Lemmon || Mount Lemmon Survey ||  || align=right data-sort-value="0.75" | 750 m || 
|-id=097 bgcolor=#d6d6d6
| 507097 ||  || — || March 19, 2009 || Kitt Peak || Spacewatch ||  || align=right | 2.3 km || 
|-id=098 bgcolor=#fefefe
| 507098 ||  || — || March 19, 2009 || Kitt Peak || Spacewatch ||  || align=right data-sort-value="0.67" | 670 m || 
|-id=099 bgcolor=#d6d6d6
| 507099 ||  || — || December 17, 2007 || Kitt Peak || Spacewatch ||  || align=right | 2.3 km || 
|-id=100 bgcolor=#d6d6d6
| 507100 ||  || — || April 20, 2009 || Purple Mountain || PMO NEO ||  || align=right | 3.3 km || 
|}

507101–507200 

|-bgcolor=#fefefe
| 507101 ||  || — || April 19, 2009 || Kitt Peak || Spacewatch ||  || align=right data-sort-value="0.70" | 700 m || 
|-id=102 bgcolor=#d6d6d6
| 507102 ||  || — || April 30, 2009 || Kitt Peak || Spacewatch ||  || align=right | 2.4 km || 
|-id=103 bgcolor=#d6d6d6
| 507103 ||  || — || April 19, 2009 || Kitt Peak || Spacewatch ||  || align=right | 2.0 km || 
|-id=104 bgcolor=#fefefe
| 507104 ||  || — || May 13, 2009 || Kitt Peak || Spacewatch ||  || align=right data-sort-value="0.73" | 730 m || 
|-id=105 bgcolor=#d6d6d6
| 507105 ||  || — || April 19, 2009 || Kitt Peak || Spacewatch ||  || align=right | 3.3 km || 
|-id=106 bgcolor=#d6d6d6
| 507106 ||  || — || May 24, 2009 || Kitt Peak || Spacewatch ||  || align=right | 2.5 km || 
|-id=107 bgcolor=#fefefe
| 507107 ||  || — || May 27, 2009 || La Sagra || OAM Obs. ||  || align=right data-sort-value="0.76" | 760 m || 
|-id=108 bgcolor=#fefefe
| 507108 ||  || — || June 12, 2009 || Kitt Peak || Spacewatch ||  || align=right data-sort-value="0.67" | 670 m || 
|-id=109 bgcolor=#fefefe
| 507109 ||  || — || July 27, 2009 || Kitt Peak || Spacewatch ||  || align=right data-sort-value="0.87" | 870 m || 
|-id=110 bgcolor=#fefefe
| 507110 ||  || — || July 29, 2009 || Kitt Peak || Spacewatch ||  || align=right data-sort-value="0.61" | 610 m || 
|-id=111 bgcolor=#fefefe
| 507111 ||  || — || August 15, 2009 || Catalina || CSS ||  || align=right data-sort-value="0.84" | 840 m || 
|-id=112 bgcolor=#fefefe
| 507112 ||  || — || September 16, 2009 || Mount Lemmon || Mount Lemmon Survey ||  || align=right data-sort-value="0.87" | 870 m || 
|-id=113 bgcolor=#fefefe
| 507113 ||  || — || March 29, 2000 || Kitt Peak || Spacewatch ||  || align=right data-sort-value="0.80" | 800 m || 
|-id=114 bgcolor=#fefefe
| 507114 ||  || — || September 16, 2009 || Kitt Peak || Spacewatch ||  || align=right data-sort-value="0.66" | 660 m || 
|-id=115 bgcolor=#fefefe
| 507115 ||  || — || September 17, 2009 || Mount Lemmon || Mount Lemmon Survey ||  || align=right data-sort-value="0.66" | 660 m || 
|-id=116 bgcolor=#fefefe
| 507116 ||  || — || July 29, 2009 || Kitt Peak || Spacewatch ||  || align=right data-sort-value="0.52" | 520 m || 
|-id=117 bgcolor=#fefefe
| 507117 ||  || — || September 18, 2009 || Kitt Peak || Spacewatch ||  || align=right data-sort-value="0.68" | 680 m || 
|-id=118 bgcolor=#fefefe
| 507118 ||  || — || September 18, 2009 || Kitt Peak || Spacewatch || H || align=right data-sort-value="0.52" | 520 m || 
|-id=119 bgcolor=#d6d6d6
| 507119 ||  || — || September 19, 2009 || Kitt Peak || Spacewatch || unusual || align=right | 3.4 km || 
|-id=120 bgcolor=#fefefe
| 507120 ||  || — || September 15, 2009 || Kitt Peak || Spacewatch ||  || align=right data-sort-value="0.98" | 980 m || 
|-id=121 bgcolor=#fefefe
| 507121 ||  || — || September 17, 2009 || Kitt Peak || Spacewatch ||  || align=right data-sort-value="0.74" | 740 m || 
|-id=122 bgcolor=#d6d6d6
| 507122 ||  || — || September 18, 2009 || Kitt Peak || Spacewatch || 3:2 || align=right | 3.5 km || 
|-id=123 bgcolor=#E9E9E9
| 507123 ||  || — || September 25, 2009 || Kitt Peak || Spacewatch ||  || align=right data-sort-value="0.62" | 620 m || 
|-id=124 bgcolor=#E9E9E9
| 507124 ||  || — || October 28, 2005 || Catalina || CSS ||  || align=right data-sort-value="0.95" | 950 m || 
|-id=125 bgcolor=#fefefe
| 507125 ||  || — || October 16, 2009 || Mount Lemmon || Mount Lemmon Survey ||  || align=right data-sort-value="0.62" | 620 m || 
|-id=126 bgcolor=#E9E9E9
| 507126 ||  || — || October 16, 2009 || Mount Lemmon || Mount Lemmon Survey ||  || align=right data-sort-value="0.63" | 630 m || 
|-id=127 bgcolor=#E9E9E9
| 507127 ||  || — || October 21, 2009 || Catalina || CSS ||  || align=right data-sort-value="0.97" | 970 m || 
|-id=128 bgcolor=#fefefe
| 507128 ||  || — || October 21, 2009 || Catalina || CSS || H || align=right data-sort-value="0.71" | 710 m || 
|-id=129 bgcolor=#E9E9E9
| 507129 ||  || — || October 14, 2009 || Mount Lemmon || Mount Lemmon Survey ||  || align=right | 1.8 km || 
|-id=130 bgcolor=#E9E9E9
| 507130 ||  || — || October 23, 2009 || Mount Lemmon || Mount Lemmon Survey ||  || align=right data-sort-value="0.66" | 660 m || 
|-id=131 bgcolor=#E9E9E9
| 507131 ||  || — || October 27, 2009 || Mount Lemmon || Mount Lemmon Survey ||  || align=right | 2.2 km || 
|-id=132 bgcolor=#E9E9E9
| 507132 ||  || — || October 25, 2005 || Mount Lemmon || Mount Lemmon Survey ||  || align=right data-sort-value="0.65" | 650 m || 
|-id=133 bgcolor=#d6d6d6
| 507133 ||  || — || November 8, 2009 || Mount Lemmon || Mount Lemmon Survey || 3:2 || align=right | 3.3 km || 
|-id=134 bgcolor=#E9E9E9
| 507134 ||  || — || November 9, 2009 || Mount Lemmon || Mount Lemmon Survey || EUN || align=right | 1.4 km || 
|-id=135 bgcolor=#E9E9E9
| 507135 ||  || — || November 9, 2009 || Kitt Peak || Spacewatch ||  || align=right data-sort-value="0.50" | 500 m || 
|-id=136 bgcolor=#E9E9E9
| 507136 ||  || — || November 11, 2009 || Kitt Peak || Spacewatch ||  || align=right | 2.3 km || 
|-id=137 bgcolor=#E9E9E9
| 507137 ||  || — || November 11, 2009 || Kitt Peak || Spacewatch ||  || align=right | 1.9 km || 
|-id=138 bgcolor=#E9E9E9
| 507138 ||  || — || December 21, 2005 || Kitt Peak || Spacewatch ||  || align=right data-sort-value="0.74" | 740 m || 
|-id=139 bgcolor=#E9E9E9
| 507139 ||  || — || November 16, 2009 || Mount Lemmon || Mount Lemmon Survey ||  || align=right data-sort-value="0.66" | 660 m || 
|-id=140 bgcolor=#fefefe
| 507140 ||  || — || November 16, 2009 || La Sagra || OAM Obs. || H || align=right data-sort-value="0.81" | 810 m || 
|-id=141 bgcolor=#E9E9E9
| 507141 ||  || — || September 19, 2009 || Mount Lemmon || Mount Lemmon Survey ||  || align=right | 1.2 km || 
|-id=142 bgcolor=#E9E9E9
| 507142 ||  || — || November 9, 2009 || Mount Lemmon || Mount Lemmon Survey ||  || align=right data-sort-value="0.72" | 720 m || 
|-id=143 bgcolor=#E9E9E9
| 507143 ||  || — || November 22, 2009 || Kitt Peak || Spacewatch ||  || align=right | 1.0 km || 
|-id=144 bgcolor=#E9E9E9
| 507144 ||  || — || November 20, 2009 || Kitt Peak || Spacewatch ||  || align=right data-sort-value="0.94" | 940 m || 
|-id=145 bgcolor=#E9E9E9
| 507145 ||  || — || November 21, 2009 || Kitt Peak || Spacewatch ||  || align=right data-sort-value="0.83" | 830 m || 
|-id=146 bgcolor=#E9E9E9
| 507146 ||  || — || October 25, 2009 || Kitt Peak || Spacewatch ||  || align=right data-sort-value="0.80" | 800 m || 
|-id=147 bgcolor=#d6d6d6
| 507147 ||  || — || November 17, 2009 || Kitt Peak || Spacewatch || 3:2 || align=right | 3.7 km || 
|-id=148 bgcolor=#fefefe
| 507148 ||  || — || November 16, 2009 || Mount Lemmon || Mount Lemmon Survey || H || align=right data-sort-value="0.95" | 950 m || 
|-id=149 bgcolor=#E9E9E9
| 507149 ||  || — || November 11, 2009 || Kitt Peak || Spacewatch ||  || align=right data-sort-value="0.71" | 710 m || 
|-id=150 bgcolor=#fefefe
| 507150 ||  || — || November 17, 2009 || Kitt Peak || Spacewatch ||  || align=right data-sort-value="0.87" | 870 m || 
|-id=151 bgcolor=#E9E9E9
| 507151 ||  || — || November 19, 2009 || Kitt Peak || Spacewatch ||  || align=right data-sort-value="0.72" | 720 m || 
|-id=152 bgcolor=#E9E9E9
| 507152 ||  || — || November 19, 2009 || Socorro || LINEAR ||  || align=right | 1.8 km || 
|-id=153 bgcolor=#E9E9E9
| 507153 ||  || — || December 29, 2005 || Mount Lemmon || Mount Lemmon Survey ||  || align=right data-sort-value="0.71" | 710 m || 
|-id=154 bgcolor=#E9E9E9
| 507154 ||  || — || November 11, 2009 || Mount Lemmon || Mount Lemmon Survey || MAR || align=right | 1.3 km || 
|-id=155 bgcolor=#E9E9E9
| 507155 ||  || — || December 15, 2009 || Mount Lemmon || Mount Lemmon Survey ||  || align=right | 1.4 km || 
|-id=156 bgcolor=#FA8072
| 507156 ||  || — || December 17, 2009 || Catalina || CSS ||  || align=right | 2.9 km || 
|-id=157 bgcolor=#E9E9E9
| 507157 ||  || — || December 17, 2009 || Mount Lemmon || Mount Lemmon Survey ||  || align=right data-sort-value="0.80" | 800 m || 
|-id=158 bgcolor=#E9E9E9
| 507158 ||  || — || December 18, 2009 || Mount Lemmon || Mount Lemmon Survey ||  || align=right | 2.9 km || 
|-id=159 bgcolor=#fefefe
| 507159 ||  || — || December 19, 2009 || Kitt Peak || Spacewatch || H || align=right data-sort-value="0.89" | 890 m || 
|-id=160 bgcolor=#E9E9E9
| 507160 ||  || — || February 1, 2006 || Kitt Peak || Spacewatch ||  || align=right | 1.1 km || 
|-id=161 bgcolor=#fefefe
| 507161 ||  || — || January 7, 2010 || Kitt Peak || Spacewatch || H || align=right data-sort-value="0.67" | 670 m || 
|-id=162 bgcolor=#E9E9E9
| 507162 ||  || — || January 6, 2010 || Kitt Peak || Spacewatch ||  || align=right | 1.1 km || 
|-id=163 bgcolor=#E9E9E9
| 507163 ||  || — || December 20, 2009 || Mount Lemmon || Mount Lemmon Survey ||  || align=right | 1.3 km || 
|-id=164 bgcolor=#E9E9E9
| 507164 ||  || — || January 18, 2010 || WISE || WISE || BAR || align=right | 1.1 km || 
|-id=165 bgcolor=#E9E9E9
| 507165 ||  || — || December 3, 2008 || Mount Lemmon || Mount Lemmon Survey ||  || align=right | 3.9 km || 
|-id=166 bgcolor=#E9E9E9
| 507166 ||  || — || February 5, 2010 || Kitt Peak || Spacewatch ||  || align=right | 2.0 km || 
|-id=167 bgcolor=#E9E9E9
| 507167 ||  || — || February 13, 2010 || Mount Lemmon || Mount Lemmon Survey ||  || align=right | 3.4 km || 
|-id=168 bgcolor=#E9E9E9
| 507168 ||  || — || February 13, 2010 || Mount Lemmon || Mount Lemmon Survey ||  || align=right | 1.2 km || 
|-id=169 bgcolor=#E9E9E9
| 507169 ||  || — || February 9, 2010 || Kitt Peak || Spacewatch ||  || align=right | 1.9 km || 
|-id=170 bgcolor=#E9E9E9
| 507170 ||  || — || February 12, 2010 || Socorro || LINEAR ||  || align=right | 1.7 km || 
|-id=171 bgcolor=#d6d6d6
| 507171 ||  || — || February 16, 2010 || WISE || WISE ||  || align=right | 3.4 km || 
|-id=172 bgcolor=#E9E9E9
| 507172 ||  || — || October 1, 2008 || Mount Lemmon || Mount Lemmon Survey ||  || align=right | 2.1 km || 
|-id=173 bgcolor=#E9E9E9
| 507173 ||  || — || February 18, 2010 || Mount Lemmon || Mount Lemmon Survey ||  || align=right | 1.8 km || 
|-id=174 bgcolor=#E9E9E9
| 507174 ||  || — || April 8, 2006 || Kitt Peak || Spacewatch ||  || align=right | 2.8 km || 
|-id=175 bgcolor=#E9E9E9
| 507175 ||  || — || January 26, 2006 || Kitt Peak || Spacewatch ||  || align=right | 2.0 km || 
|-id=176 bgcolor=#E9E9E9
| 507176 ||  || — || January 26, 2010 || WISE || WISE ||  || align=right | 1.0 km || 
|-id=177 bgcolor=#E9E9E9
| 507177 ||  || — || March 20, 2010 || Catalina || CSS ||  || align=right | 1.7 km || 
|-id=178 bgcolor=#C2FFFF
| 507178 ||  || — || January 18, 2015 || Haleakala || Pan-STARRS || L5 || align=right | 11 km || 
|-id=179 bgcolor=#E9E9E9
| 507179 ||  || — || February 13, 2010 || Catalina || CSS ||  || align=right | 2.3 km || 
|-id=180 bgcolor=#d6d6d6
| 507180 ||  || — || May 6, 2010 || Mount Lemmon || Mount Lemmon Survey ||  || align=right | 3.0 km || 
|-id=181 bgcolor=#d6d6d6
| 507181 ||  || — || May 11, 2010 || WISE || WISE ||  || align=right | 4.1 km || 
|-id=182 bgcolor=#E9E9E9
| 507182 ||  || — || November 27, 2009 || Mount Lemmon || Mount Lemmon Survey || ADE || align=right | 2.6 km || 
|-id=183 bgcolor=#fefefe
| 507183 ||  || — || June 21, 2010 || Mount Lemmon || Mount Lemmon Survey || PHO || align=right data-sort-value="0.91" | 910 m || 
|-id=184 bgcolor=#fefefe
| 507184 ||  || — || July 4, 2010 || Kitt Peak || Spacewatch ||  || align=right data-sort-value="0.64" | 640 m || 
|-id=185 bgcolor=#d6d6d6
| 507185 ||  || — || August 6, 2010 || WISE || WISE || 7:4 || align=right | 3.6 km || 
|-id=186 bgcolor=#fefefe
| 507186 ||  || — || August 8, 2010 || WISE || WISE ||  || align=right | 1.9 km || 
|-id=187 bgcolor=#fefefe
| 507187 ||  || — || January 10, 2008 || Mount Lemmon || Mount Lemmon Survey ||  || align=right data-sort-value="0.52" | 520 m || 
|-id=188 bgcolor=#fefefe
| 507188 ||  || — || September 4, 2010 || Kitt Peak || Spacewatch ||  || align=right data-sort-value="0.83" | 830 m || 
|-id=189 bgcolor=#fefefe
| 507189 ||  || — || September 11, 2010 || La Sagra || OAM Obs. ||  || align=right data-sort-value="0.74" | 740 m || 
|-id=190 bgcolor=#fefefe
| 507190 ||  || — || September 20, 2003 || Kitt Peak || Spacewatch ||  || align=right data-sort-value="0.46" | 460 m || 
|-id=191 bgcolor=#fefefe
| 507191 ||  || — || September 25, 2000 || Kitt Peak || Spacewatch ||  || align=right data-sort-value="0.58" | 580 m || 
|-id=192 bgcolor=#fefefe
| 507192 ||  || — || September 16, 2003 || Kitt Peak || Spacewatch ||  || align=right data-sort-value="0.49" | 490 m || 
|-id=193 bgcolor=#fefefe
| 507193 ||  || — || September 6, 2010 || Kitt Peak || Spacewatch ||  || align=right data-sort-value="0.68" | 680 m || 
|-id=194 bgcolor=#fefefe
| 507194 ||  || — || September 6, 2010 || Kitt Peak || Spacewatch ||  || align=right data-sort-value="0.76" | 760 m || 
|-id=195 bgcolor=#fefefe
| 507195 ||  || — || September 17, 2010 || Kitt Peak || Spacewatch ||  || align=right data-sort-value="0.65" | 650 m || 
|-id=196 bgcolor=#fefefe
| 507196 ||  || — || September 10, 2010 || Kitt Peak || Spacewatch ||  || align=right data-sort-value="0.60" | 600 m || 
|-id=197 bgcolor=#fefefe
| 507197 ||  || — || September 18, 2010 || Kitt Peak || Spacewatch ||  || align=right data-sort-value="0.76" | 760 m || 
|-id=198 bgcolor=#fefefe
| 507198 ||  || — || September 20, 2003 || Kitt Peak || Spacewatch ||  || align=right data-sort-value="0.43" | 430 m || 
|-id=199 bgcolor=#fefefe
| 507199 ||  || — || October 1, 2010 || Kitt Peak || Spacewatch ||  || align=right data-sort-value="0.55" | 550 m || 
|-id=200 bgcolor=#fefefe
| 507200 ||  || — || October 1, 2010 || Kitt Peak || Spacewatch ||  || align=right data-sort-value="0.71" | 710 m || 
|}

507201–507300 

|-bgcolor=#fefefe
| 507201 ||  || — || October 9, 2010 || Mount Lemmon || Mount Lemmon Survey ||  || align=right data-sort-value="0.59" | 590 m || 
|-id=202 bgcolor=#fefefe
| 507202 ||  || — || November 2, 2000 || Kitt Peak || Spacewatch ||  || align=right data-sort-value="0.82" | 820 m || 
|-id=203 bgcolor=#fefefe
| 507203 ||  || — || September 17, 2010 || Kitt Peak || Spacewatch ||  || align=right data-sort-value="0.68" | 680 m || 
|-id=204 bgcolor=#fefefe
| 507204 ||  || — || September 18, 2003 || Kitt Peak || Spacewatch || V || align=right data-sort-value="0.51" | 510 m || 
|-id=205 bgcolor=#fefefe
| 507205 ||  || — || October 17, 2010 || Mount Lemmon || Mount Lemmon Survey ||  || align=right data-sort-value="0.58" | 580 m || 
|-id=206 bgcolor=#fefefe
| 507206 ||  || — || October 13, 2010 || Mount Lemmon || Mount Lemmon Survey ||  || align=right data-sort-value="0.63" | 630 m || 
|-id=207 bgcolor=#fefefe
| 507207 ||  || — || October 13, 2010 || Mount Lemmon || Mount Lemmon Survey || V || align=right data-sort-value="0.53" | 530 m || 
|-id=208 bgcolor=#fefefe
| 507208 ||  || — || October 13, 2010 || Catalina || CSS ||  || align=right data-sort-value="0.70" | 700 m || 
|-id=209 bgcolor=#d6d6d6
| 507209 ||  || — || October 12, 2010 || Mount Lemmon || Mount Lemmon Survey || SYL7:4 || align=right | 4.2 km || 
|-id=210 bgcolor=#fefefe
| 507210 ||  || — || December 4, 2007 || Mount Lemmon || Mount Lemmon Survey ||  || align=right data-sort-value="0.80" | 800 m || 
|-id=211 bgcolor=#fefefe
| 507211 ||  || — || October 29, 2010 || Kitt Peak || Spacewatch || NYS || align=right data-sort-value="0.48" | 480 m || 
|-id=212 bgcolor=#fefefe
| 507212 ||  || — || November 3, 2010 || Mount Lemmon || Mount Lemmon Survey ||  || align=right data-sort-value="0.64" | 640 m || 
|-id=213 bgcolor=#fefefe
| 507213 ||  || — || November 3, 2010 || Mount Lemmon || Mount Lemmon Survey ||  || align=right data-sort-value="0.64" | 640 m || 
|-id=214 bgcolor=#fefefe
| 507214 ||  || — || November 4, 2010 || La Sagra || OAM Obs. ||  || align=right data-sort-value="0.75" | 750 m || 
|-id=215 bgcolor=#fefefe
| 507215 ||  || — || October 17, 2010 || Mount Lemmon || Mount Lemmon Survey ||  || align=right data-sort-value="0.83" | 830 m || 
|-id=216 bgcolor=#fefefe
| 507216 ||  || — || November 3, 2010 || Mount Lemmon || Mount Lemmon Survey ||  || align=right | 1.00 km || 
|-id=217 bgcolor=#fefefe
| 507217 ||  || — || November 1, 2010 || Kitt Peak || Spacewatch ||  || align=right data-sort-value="0.66" | 660 m || 
|-id=218 bgcolor=#fefefe
| 507218 ||  || — || November 11, 2010 || Mount Lemmon || Mount Lemmon Survey ||  || align=right data-sort-value="0.72" | 720 m || 
|-id=219 bgcolor=#fefefe
| 507219 ||  || — || September 20, 2003 || Kitt Peak || Spacewatch ||  || align=right data-sort-value="0.78" | 780 m || 
|-id=220 bgcolor=#C2FFFF
| 507220 ||  || — || September 28, 2008 || Mount Lemmon || Mount Lemmon Survey || L4 || align=right | 7.4 km || 
|-id=221 bgcolor=#fefefe
| 507221 ||  || — || September 3, 1999 || Kitt Peak || Spacewatch ||  || align=right data-sort-value="0.45" | 450 m || 
|-id=222 bgcolor=#fefefe
| 507222 ||  || — || October 29, 2010 || Kitt Peak || Spacewatch ||  || align=right data-sort-value="0.67" | 670 m || 
|-id=223 bgcolor=#fefefe
| 507223 ||  || — || November 3, 2010 || Kitt Peak || Spacewatch ||  || align=right data-sort-value="0.57" | 570 m || 
|-id=224 bgcolor=#fefefe
| 507224 ||  || — || October 14, 2010 || Mount Lemmon || Mount Lemmon Survey ||  || align=right data-sort-value="0.65" | 650 m || 
|-id=225 bgcolor=#fefefe
| 507225 ||  || — || December 14, 1999 || Catalina || CSS || PHO || align=right | 1.1 km || 
|-id=226 bgcolor=#fefefe
| 507226 ||  || — || October 27, 2003 || Kitt Peak || Spacewatch ||  || align=right data-sort-value="0.57" | 570 m || 
|-id=227 bgcolor=#fefefe
| 507227 ||  || — || December 11, 2010 || Catalina || CSS ||  || align=right | 1.3 km || 
|-id=228 bgcolor=#fefefe
| 507228 ||  || — || March 15, 2004 || Catalina || CSS ||  || align=right data-sort-value="0.61" | 610 m || 
|-id=229 bgcolor=#fefefe
| 507229 ||  || — || November 23, 2006 || Kitt Peak || Spacewatch ||  || align=right data-sort-value="0.56" | 560 m || 
|-id=230 bgcolor=#fefefe
| 507230 ||  || — || January 24, 1996 || Kitt Peak || Spacewatch ||  || align=right data-sort-value="0.72" | 720 m || 
|-id=231 bgcolor=#fefefe
| 507231 ||  || — || December 5, 2010 || Mount Lemmon || Mount Lemmon Survey ||  || align=right data-sort-value="0.59" | 590 m || 
|-id=232 bgcolor=#d6d6d6
| 507232 ||  || — || October 11, 2009 || Mount Lemmon || Mount Lemmon Survey || SHU3:2 || align=right | 4.2 km || 
|-id=233 bgcolor=#fefefe
| 507233 ||  || — || December 3, 2010 || Mount Lemmon || Mount Lemmon Survey ||  || align=right data-sort-value="0.79" | 790 m || 
|-id=234 bgcolor=#fefefe
| 507234 ||  || — || January 10, 2011 || Mount Lemmon || Mount Lemmon Survey ||  || align=right data-sort-value="0.70" | 700 m || 
|-id=235 bgcolor=#fefefe
| 507235 ||  || — || January 10, 2011 || Kitt Peak || Spacewatch || NYS || align=right data-sort-value="0.49" | 490 m || 
|-id=236 bgcolor=#fefefe
| 507236 ||  || — || January 13, 2011 || Kitt Peak || Spacewatch ||  || align=right data-sort-value="0.50" | 500 m || 
|-id=237 bgcolor=#fefefe
| 507237 ||  || — || November 16, 2006 || Mount Lemmon || Mount Lemmon Survey ||  || align=right data-sort-value="0.64" | 640 m || 
|-id=238 bgcolor=#fefefe
| 507238 ||  || — || December 24, 2006 || Kitt Peak || Spacewatch || NYS || align=right data-sort-value="0.48" | 480 m || 
|-id=239 bgcolor=#fefefe
| 507239 ||  || — || January 11, 2011 || Mount Lemmon || Mount Lemmon Survey ||  || align=right data-sort-value="0.64" | 640 m || 
|-id=240 bgcolor=#fefefe
| 507240 ||  || — || December 8, 2010 || Mount Lemmon || Mount Lemmon Survey ||  || align=right data-sort-value="0.73" | 730 m || 
|-id=241 bgcolor=#fefefe
| 507241 ||  || — || September 30, 2006 || Mount Lemmon || Mount Lemmon Survey || NYS || align=right data-sort-value="0.64" | 640 m || 
|-id=242 bgcolor=#fefefe
| 507242 ||  || — || December 8, 2010 || Mount Lemmon || Mount Lemmon Survey ||  || align=right data-sort-value="0.69" | 690 m || 
|-id=243 bgcolor=#fefefe
| 507243 ||  || — || December 26, 2006 || Kitt Peak || Spacewatch ||  || align=right data-sort-value="0.87" | 870 m || 
|-id=244 bgcolor=#fefefe
| 507244 ||  || — || December 9, 2010 || Mount Lemmon || Mount Lemmon Survey ||  || align=right data-sort-value="0.62" | 620 m || 
|-id=245 bgcolor=#fefefe
| 507245 ||  || — || January 13, 2011 || Kitt Peak || Spacewatch ||  || align=right data-sort-value="0.78" | 780 m || 
|-id=246 bgcolor=#d6d6d6
| 507246 ||  || — || October 26, 2009 || Kitt Peak || Spacewatch || 3:2 || align=right | 3.2 km || 
|-id=247 bgcolor=#fefefe
| 507247 ||  || — || January 27, 2011 || Mount Lemmon || Mount Lemmon Survey ||  || align=right data-sort-value="0.80" | 800 m || 
|-id=248 bgcolor=#fefefe
| 507248 ||  || — || November 15, 2006 || Catalina || CSS ||  || align=right data-sort-value="0.71" | 710 m || 
|-id=249 bgcolor=#fefefe
| 507249 ||  || — || December 15, 2006 || Kitt Peak || Spacewatch ||  || align=right data-sort-value="0.68" | 680 m || 
|-id=250 bgcolor=#d6d6d6
| 507250 ||  || — || November 24, 2009 || Kitt Peak || Spacewatch || 3:2 || align=right | 3.3 km || 
|-id=251 bgcolor=#E9E9E9
| 507251 ||  || — || July 26, 2008 || Siding Spring || SSS ||  || align=right data-sort-value="0.89" | 890 m || 
|-id=252 bgcolor=#E9E9E9
| 507252 ||  || — || January 8, 2011 || Mount Lemmon || Mount Lemmon Survey ||  || align=right | 1.2 km || 
|-id=253 bgcolor=#fefefe
| 507253 ||  || — || October 28, 2006 || Mount Lemmon || Mount Lemmon Survey ||  || align=right data-sort-value="0.57" | 570 m || 
|-id=254 bgcolor=#fefefe
| 507254 ||  || — || January 24, 2011 || Mount Lemmon || Mount Lemmon Survey ||  || align=right data-sort-value="0.80" | 800 m || 
|-id=255 bgcolor=#E9E9E9
| 507255 ||  || — || January 28, 2007 || Kitt Peak || Spacewatch ||  || align=right data-sort-value="0.87" | 870 m || 
|-id=256 bgcolor=#fefefe
| 507256 ||  || — || August 30, 2005 || Kitt Peak || Spacewatch ||  || align=right data-sort-value="0.78" | 780 m || 
|-id=257 bgcolor=#fefefe
| 507257 ||  || — || November 20, 2006 || Kitt Peak || Spacewatch || NYS || align=right data-sort-value="0.48" | 480 m || 
|-id=258 bgcolor=#fefefe
| 507258 ||  || — || January 27, 2011 || Mount Lemmon || Mount Lemmon Survey || MAS || align=right data-sort-value="0.54" | 540 m || 
|-id=259 bgcolor=#fefefe
| 507259 ||  || — || May 19, 2004 || Campo Imperatore || CINEOS ||  || align=right data-sort-value="0.82" | 820 m || 
|-id=260 bgcolor=#fefefe
| 507260 ||  || — || January 30, 2011 || Haleakala || Pan-STARRS || V || align=right data-sort-value="0.62" | 620 m || 
|-id=261 bgcolor=#FA8072
| 507261 ||  || — || February 7, 2011 || La Sagra || OAM Obs. ||  || align=right data-sort-value="0.64" | 640 m || 
|-id=262 bgcolor=#fefefe
| 507262 ||  || — || January 26, 2011 || Catalina || CSS || H || align=right data-sort-value="0.51" | 510 m || 
|-id=263 bgcolor=#fefefe
| 507263 ||  || — || November 17, 2006 || Kitt Peak || Spacewatch || MAS || align=right data-sort-value="0.52" | 520 m || 
|-id=264 bgcolor=#fefefe
| 507264 ||  || — || January 24, 2007 || Mount Lemmon || Mount Lemmon Survey ||  || align=right data-sort-value="0.65" | 650 m || 
|-id=265 bgcolor=#fefefe
| 507265 ||  || — || December 1, 2006 || Mount Lemmon || Mount Lemmon Survey ||  || align=right data-sort-value="0.62" | 620 m || 
|-id=266 bgcolor=#E9E9E9
| 507266 ||  || — || November 25, 2009 || Catalina || CSS ||  || align=right | 1.2 km || 
|-id=267 bgcolor=#fefefe
| 507267 ||  || — || February 10, 2011 || Mount Lemmon || Mount Lemmon Survey || H || align=right data-sort-value="0.50" | 500 m || 
|-id=268 bgcolor=#fefefe
| 507268 ||  || — || February 4, 2011 || Catalina || CSS || H || align=right data-sort-value="0.62" | 620 m || 
|-id=269 bgcolor=#fefefe
| 507269 ||  || — || January 27, 2007 || Kitt Peak || Spacewatch || MAS || align=right data-sort-value="0.52" | 520 m || 
|-id=270 bgcolor=#fefefe
| 507270 ||  || — || January 28, 2011 || Mount Lemmon || Mount Lemmon Survey ||  || align=right data-sort-value="0.79" | 790 m || 
|-id=271 bgcolor=#E9E9E9
| 507271 ||  || — || March 2, 2011 || Kitt Peak || Spacewatch ||  || align=right | 1.4 km || 
|-id=272 bgcolor=#fefefe
| 507272 ||  || — || March 6, 2011 || Kitt Peak || Spacewatch ||  || align=right data-sort-value="0.89" | 890 m || 
|-id=273 bgcolor=#fefefe
| 507273 ||  || — || January 8, 2011 || Mount Lemmon || Mount Lemmon Survey ||  || align=right data-sort-value="0.60" | 600 m || 
|-id=274 bgcolor=#E9E9E9
| 507274 ||  || — || March 5, 2011 || Mount Lemmon || Mount Lemmon Survey ||  || align=right | 1.1 km || 
|-id=275 bgcolor=#fefefe
| 507275 ||  || — || February 6, 2007 || Kitt Peak || Spacewatch || MAS || align=right data-sort-value="0.56" | 560 m || 
|-id=276 bgcolor=#fefefe
| 507276 ||  || — || March 12, 2011 || Mount Lemmon || Mount Lemmon Survey || H || align=right data-sort-value="0.65" | 650 m || 
|-id=277 bgcolor=#d6d6d6
| 507277 ||  || — || March 11, 2011 || Mount Lemmon || Mount Lemmon Survey || Tj (2.95) || align=right | 3.5 km || 
|-id=278 bgcolor=#fefefe
| 507278 ||  || — || September 21, 2009 || Mount Lemmon || Mount Lemmon Survey ||  || align=right data-sort-value="0.68" | 680 m || 
|-id=279 bgcolor=#fefefe
| 507279 ||  || — || January 27, 2007 || Kitt Peak || Spacewatch ||  || align=right data-sort-value="0.74" | 740 m || 
|-id=280 bgcolor=#fefefe
| 507280 ||  || — || February 10, 2011 || Catalina || CSS || H || align=right data-sort-value="0.63" | 630 m || 
|-id=281 bgcolor=#E9E9E9
| 507281 ||  || — || January 2, 2011 || Mount Lemmon || Mount Lemmon Survey ||  || align=right | 2.1 km || 
|-id=282 bgcolor=#E9E9E9
| 507282 ||  || — || March 31, 2003 || Kitt Peak || Spacewatch ||  || align=right | 1.1 km || 
|-id=283 bgcolor=#fefefe
| 507283 ||  || — || March 11, 2011 || Catalina || CSS ||  || align=right data-sort-value="0.87" | 870 m || 
|-id=284 bgcolor=#E9E9E9
| 507284 ||  || — || April 18, 2007 || Mount Lemmon || Mount Lemmon Survey ||  || align=right data-sort-value="0.82" | 820 m || 
|-id=285 bgcolor=#E9E9E9
| 507285 ||  || — || April 24, 2011 || Mount Lemmon || Mount Lemmon Survey ||  || align=right | 1.4 km || 
|-id=286 bgcolor=#E9E9E9
| 507286 ||  || — || April 22, 2011 || Kitt Peak || Spacewatch ||  || align=right | 1.5 km || 
|-id=287 bgcolor=#fefefe
| 507287 ||  || — || April 27, 2011 || Kitt Peak || Spacewatch || H || align=right data-sort-value="0.75" | 750 m || 
|-id=288 bgcolor=#E9E9E9
| 507288 ||  || — || May 21, 2007 || Kitt Peak || Spacewatch ||  || align=right data-sort-value="0.82" | 820 m || 
|-id=289 bgcolor=#fefefe
| 507289 ||  || — || April 29, 2011 || Mount Lemmon || Mount Lemmon Survey || H || align=right data-sort-value="0.78" | 780 m || 
|-id=290 bgcolor=#fefefe
| 507290 ||  || — || September 24, 2009 || Kitt Peak || Spacewatch || H || align=right data-sort-value="0.54" | 540 m || 
|-id=291 bgcolor=#E9E9E9
| 507291 ||  || — || April 2, 2011 || Mount Lemmon || Mount Lemmon Survey ||  || align=right data-sort-value="0.81" | 810 m || 
|-id=292 bgcolor=#E9E9E9
| 507292 ||  || — || April 6, 2011 || Kitt Peak || Spacewatch ||  || align=right | 1.9 km || 
|-id=293 bgcolor=#fefefe
| 507293 ||  || — || May 5, 2011 || Kitt Peak || Spacewatch || H || align=right data-sort-value="0.44" | 440 m || 
|-id=294 bgcolor=#d6d6d6
| 507294 ||  || — || May 6, 2011 || Kitt Peak || Spacewatch ||  || align=right | 2.8 km || 
|-id=295 bgcolor=#E9E9E9
| 507295 ||  || — || January 14, 2011 || Mount Lemmon || Mount Lemmon Survey ||  || align=right | 1.1 km || 
|-id=296 bgcolor=#fefefe
| 507296 ||  || — || May 30, 2011 || Haleakala || Pan-STARRS || H || align=right data-sort-value="0.87" | 870 m || 
|-id=297 bgcolor=#E9E9E9
| 507297 ||  || — || January 7, 2006 || Mount Lemmon || Mount Lemmon Survey ||  || align=right | 1.2 km || 
|-id=298 bgcolor=#E9E9E9
| 507298 ||  || — || May 21, 2011 || Haleakala || Pan-STARRS ||  || align=right | 2.1 km || 
|-id=299 bgcolor=#d6d6d6
| 507299 ||  || — || May 8, 2011 || Mount Lemmon || Mount Lemmon Survey ||  || align=right | 3.3 km || 
|-id=300 bgcolor=#E9E9E9
| 507300 ||  || — || May 24, 2011 || Haleakala || Pan-STARRS ||  || align=right | 1.2 km || 
|}

507301–507400 

|-bgcolor=#E9E9E9
| 507301 ||  || — || June 5, 2011 || Kitt Peak || Spacewatch ||  || align=right | 1.6 km || 
|-id=302 bgcolor=#E9E9E9
| 507302 ||  || — || May 24, 2011 || Mount Lemmon || Mount Lemmon Survey || MRX || align=right data-sort-value="0.77" | 770 m || 
|-id=303 bgcolor=#E9E9E9
| 507303 ||  || — || May 21, 2011 || Haleakala || Pan-STARRS ||  || align=right | 2.0 km || 
|-id=304 bgcolor=#fefefe
| 507304 ||  || — || June 9, 2011 || Mount Lemmon || Mount Lemmon Survey || H || align=right data-sort-value="0.65" | 650 m || 
|-id=305 bgcolor=#d6d6d6
| 507305 ||  || — || July 25, 2011 || Haleakala || Pan-STARRS ||  || align=right | 2.1 km || 
|-id=306 bgcolor=#E9E9E9
| 507306 ||  || — || July 28, 2011 || Haleakala || Pan-STARRS || MAR || align=right | 1.5 km || 
|-id=307 bgcolor=#C2FFFF
| 507307 ||  || — || July 25, 2011 || Haleakala || Pan-STARRS || L5 || align=right | 8.1 km || 
|-id=308 bgcolor=#d6d6d6
| 507308 ||  || — || September 27, 2006 || Catalina || CSS ||  || align=right | 2.6 km || 
|-id=309 bgcolor=#d6d6d6
| 507309 ||  || — || July 28, 2011 || Haleakala || Pan-STARRS || EOS || align=right | 1.3 km || 
|-id=310 bgcolor=#d6d6d6
| 507310 ||  || — || July 21, 2010 || WISE || WISE ||  || align=right | 3.4 km || 
|-id=311 bgcolor=#d6d6d6
| 507311 ||  || — || June 8, 2011 || Haleakala || Pan-STARRS || 7:4 || align=right | 4.0 km || 
|-id=312 bgcolor=#d6d6d6
| 507312 ||  || — || July 12, 2010 || WISE || WISE ||  || align=right | 3.2 km || 
|-id=313 bgcolor=#d6d6d6
| 507313 ||  || — || June 1, 2005 || Kitt Peak || Spacewatch ||  || align=right | 1.9 km || 
|-id=314 bgcolor=#d6d6d6
| 507314 ||  || — || August 27, 2011 || Haleakala || Pan-STARRS ||  || align=right | 2.1 km || 
|-id=315 bgcolor=#d6d6d6
| 507315 ||  || — || May 7, 2010 || Kitt Peak || Spacewatch || 7:4 || align=right | 3.2 km || 
|-id=316 bgcolor=#d6d6d6
| 507316 ||  || — || January 13, 2008 || Kitt Peak || Spacewatch ||  || align=right | 3.2 km || 
|-id=317 bgcolor=#d6d6d6
| 507317 ||  || — || August 29, 2011 || Siding Spring || SSS ||  || align=right | 3.6 km || 
|-id=318 bgcolor=#d6d6d6
| 507318 ||  || — || October 20, 2006 || Mount Lemmon || Mount Lemmon Survey ||  || align=right | 2.2 km || 
|-id=319 bgcolor=#d6d6d6
| 507319 ||  || — || June 10, 2011 || Mount Lemmon || Mount Lemmon Survey ||  || align=right | 3.2 km || 
|-id=320 bgcolor=#d6d6d6
| 507320 ||  || — || September 15, 2011 || Haleakala || Pan-STARRS ||  || align=right | 2.0 km || 
|-id=321 bgcolor=#d6d6d6
| 507321 ||  || — || September 7, 2011 || Kitt Peak || Spacewatch ||  || align=right | 1.9 km || 
|-id=322 bgcolor=#d6d6d6
| 507322 ||  || — || September 7, 2011 || Kitt Peak || Spacewatch ||  || align=right | 2.6 km || 
|-id=323 bgcolor=#d6d6d6
| 507323 ||  || — || August 30, 2011 || Haleakala || Pan-STARRS ||  || align=right | 3.1 km || 
|-id=324 bgcolor=#d6d6d6
| 507324 ||  || — || October 21, 2006 || Mount Lemmon || Mount Lemmon Survey ||  || align=right | 1.6 km || 
|-id=325 bgcolor=#d6d6d6
| 507325 ||  || — || May 4, 2010 || Kitt Peak || Spacewatch ||  || align=right | 2.3 km || 
|-id=326 bgcolor=#d6d6d6
| 507326 ||  || — || September 23, 2011 || Kitt Peak || Spacewatch ||  || align=right | 3.1 km || 
|-id=327 bgcolor=#d6d6d6
| 507327 ||  || — || September 21, 2011 || Kitt Peak || Spacewatch ||  || align=right | 2.8 km || 
|-id=328 bgcolor=#d6d6d6
| 507328 ||  || — || September 23, 2011 || Haleakala || Pan-STARRS || Tj (2.98) || align=right | 3.3 km || 
|-id=329 bgcolor=#d6d6d6
| 507329 ||  || — || August 20, 2011 || Haleakala || Pan-STARRS ||  || align=right | 2.7 km || 
|-id=330 bgcolor=#d6d6d6
| 507330 ||  || — || March 12, 1996 || Kitt Peak || Spacewatch || EUP || align=right | 2.3 km || 
|-id=331 bgcolor=#d6d6d6
| 507331 ||  || — || September 21, 2011 || Kitt Peak || Spacewatch || Tj (2.99) || align=right | 2.4 km || 
|-id=332 bgcolor=#d6d6d6
| 507332 ||  || — || September 23, 2011 || Kitt Peak || Spacewatch || EOS || align=right | 1.9 km || 
|-id=333 bgcolor=#d6d6d6
| 507333 ||  || — || October 31, 2006 || Mount Lemmon || Mount Lemmon Survey ||  || align=right | 2.1 km || 
|-id=334 bgcolor=#d6d6d6
| 507334 ||  || — || December 13, 2006 || Mount Lemmon || Mount Lemmon Survey ||  || align=right | 2.4 km || 
|-id=335 bgcolor=#d6d6d6
| 507335 ||  || — || September 8, 2011 || Haleakala || Pan-STARRS ||  || align=right | 3.2 km || 
|-id=336 bgcolor=#d6d6d6
| 507336 ||  || — || October 1, 2011 || Kitt Peak || Spacewatch ||  || align=right | 2.2 km || 
|-id=337 bgcolor=#d6d6d6
| 507337 ||  || — || July 3, 2005 || Mount Lemmon || Mount Lemmon Survey ||  || align=right | 2.4 km || 
|-id=338 bgcolor=#d6d6d6
| 507338 ||  || — || October 31, 2006 || Mount Lemmon || Mount Lemmon Survey || EOS || align=right | 1.7 km || 
|-id=339 bgcolor=#d6d6d6
| 507339 ||  || — || November 27, 2006 || Kitt Peak || Spacewatch ||  || align=right | 2.3 km || 
|-id=340 bgcolor=#d6d6d6
| 507340 ||  || — || October 18, 2011 || Mount Lemmon || Mount Lemmon Survey ||  || align=right | 2.5 km || 
|-id=341 bgcolor=#d6d6d6
| 507341 ||  || — || October 1, 2011 || Kitt Peak || Spacewatch ||  || align=right | 2.1 km || 
|-id=342 bgcolor=#d6d6d6
| 507342 ||  || — || October 18, 2011 || Catalina || CSS || Tj (2.99) || align=right | 3.7 km || 
|-id=343 bgcolor=#d6d6d6
| 507343 ||  || — || October 22, 2011 || Kitt Peak || Spacewatch ||  || align=right | 2.3 km || 
|-id=344 bgcolor=#d6d6d6
| 507344 ||  || — || July 5, 2011 || Haleakala || Pan-STARRS ||  || align=right | 3.1 km || 
|-id=345 bgcolor=#fefefe
| 507345 ||  || — || April 15, 2010 || Mount Lemmon || Mount Lemmon Survey ||  || align=right data-sort-value="0.73" | 730 m || 
|-id=346 bgcolor=#d6d6d6
| 507346 ||  || — || September 23, 2011 || Haleakala || Pan-STARRS ||  || align=right | 2.7 km || 
|-id=347 bgcolor=#d6d6d6
| 507347 ||  || — || October 19, 2011 || Mount Lemmon || Mount Lemmon Survey || EOS || align=right | 1.5 km || 
|-id=348 bgcolor=#d6d6d6
| 507348 ||  || — || December 20, 2000 || Kitt Peak || Spacewatch ||  || align=right | 2.5 km || 
|-id=349 bgcolor=#d6d6d6
| 507349 ||  || — || December 15, 2006 || Socorro || LINEAR ||  || align=right | 3.3 km || 
|-id=350 bgcolor=#d6d6d6
| 507350 ||  || — || September 4, 2011 || Haleakala || Pan-STARRS ||  || align=right | 2.0 km || 
|-id=351 bgcolor=#d6d6d6
| 507351 ||  || — || September 20, 2011 || Kitt Peak || Spacewatch ||  || align=right | 2.8 km || 
|-id=352 bgcolor=#d6d6d6
| 507352 ||  || — || October 21, 2011 || Mount Lemmon || Mount Lemmon Survey ||  || align=right | 3.1 km || 
|-id=353 bgcolor=#d6d6d6
| 507353 ||  || — || October 25, 2011 || Haleakala || Pan-STARRS ||  || align=right | 2.7 km || 
|-id=354 bgcolor=#C2FFFF
| 507354 ||  || — || October 26, 2011 || Haleakala || Pan-STARRS || L4 || align=right | 7.1 km || 
|-id=355 bgcolor=#FFC2E0
| 507355 ||  || — || November 3, 2011 || Catalina || CSS || APO || align=right data-sort-value="0.53" | 530 m || 
|-id=356 bgcolor=#d6d6d6
| 507356 ||  || — || October 29, 2011 || Haleakala || Pan-STARRS ||  || align=right | 2.9 km || 
|-id=357 bgcolor=#fefefe
| 507357 ||  || — || April 25, 2007 || Mount Lemmon || Mount Lemmon Survey ||  || align=right data-sort-value="0.71" | 710 m || 
|-id=358 bgcolor=#d6d6d6
| 507358 ||  || — || March 11, 2008 || Kitt Peak || Spacewatch || TIR || align=right | 2.5 km || 
|-id=359 bgcolor=#d6d6d6
| 507359 ||  || — || April 25, 2010 || WISE || WISE || 7:4 || align=right | 3.2 km || 
|-id=360 bgcolor=#d6d6d6
| 507360 ||  || — || October 26, 2011 || Haleakala || Pan-STARRS || TIR || align=right | 2.6 km || 
|-id=361 bgcolor=#d6d6d6
| 507361 ||  || — || October 22, 2005 || Kitt Peak || Spacewatch || 7:4* || align=right | 1.7 km || 
|-id=362 bgcolor=#d6d6d6
| 507362 ||  || — || June 9, 2010 || WISE || WISE || Tj (2.99) || align=right | 4.2 km || 
|-id=363 bgcolor=#d6d6d6
| 507363 ||  || — || October 23, 2011 || Haleakala || Pan-STARRS ||  || align=right | 3.0 km || 
|-id=364 bgcolor=#d6d6d6
| 507364 ||  || — || October 23, 2011 || Haleakala || Pan-STARRS ||  || align=right | 2.7 km || 
|-id=365 bgcolor=#d6d6d6
| 507365 ||  || — || October 8, 2005 || Catalina || CSS ||  || align=right | 4.0 km || 
|-id=366 bgcolor=#FFC2E0
| 507366 ||  || — || December 1, 2011 || Catalina || CSS || AMO +1kmcritical || align=right | 1.6 km || 
|-id=367 bgcolor=#d6d6d6
| 507367 ||  || — || June 19, 2010 || WISE || WISE ||  || align=right | 3.9 km || 
|-id=368 bgcolor=#d6d6d6
| 507368 ||  || — || December 28, 2000 || Kitt Peak || Spacewatch ||  || align=right | 3.9 km || 
|-id=369 bgcolor=#fefefe
| 507369 ||  || — || February 1, 2009 || Kitt Peak || Spacewatch ||  || align=right data-sort-value="0.52" | 520 m || 
|-id=370 bgcolor=#C2FFFF
| 507370 ||  || — || January 28, 2010 || WISE || WISE || L4 || align=right | 7.8 km || 
|-id=371 bgcolor=#d6d6d6
| 507371 ||  || — || July 1, 2010 || WISE || WISE || Tj (2.99) || align=right | 4.6 km || 
|-id=372 bgcolor=#d6d6d6
| 507372 ||  || — || January 21, 2012 || Haleakala || Pan-STARRS ||  || align=right | 5.0 km || 
|-id=373 bgcolor=#fefefe
| 507373 ||  || — || September 10, 2007 || Mount Lemmon || Mount Lemmon Survey ||  || align=right data-sort-value="0.49" | 490 m || 
|-id=374 bgcolor=#fefefe
| 507374 ||  || — || March 16, 2009 || Kitt Peak || Spacewatch ||  || align=right data-sort-value="0.57" | 570 m || 
|-id=375 bgcolor=#fefefe
| 507375 ||  || — || October 12, 2007 || Mount Lemmon || Mount Lemmon Survey ||  || align=right data-sort-value="0.52" | 520 m || 
|-id=376 bgcolor=#fefefe
| 507376 ||  || — || January 21, 2012 || Kitt Peak || Spacewatch ||  || align=right data-sort-value="0.71" | 710 m || 
|-id=377 bgcolor=#fefefe
| 507377 ||  || — || February 4, 2012 || Haleakala || Pan-STARRS ||  || align=right data-sort-value="0.75" | 750 m || 
|-id=378 bgcolor=#fefefe
| 507378 ||  || — || September 16, 2010 || Mount Lemmon || Mount Lemmon Survey ||  || align=right data-sort-value="0.70" | 700 m || 
|-id=379 bgcolor=#fefefe
| 507379 ||  || — || December 19, 2004 || Mount Lemmon || Mount Lemmon Survey ||  || align=right data-sort-value="0.56" | 560 m || 
|-id=380 bgcolor=#fefefe
| 507380 ||  || — || October 17, 2007 || Mount Lemmon || Mount Lemmon Survey ||  || align=right data-sort-value="0.59" | 590 m || 
|-id=381 bgcolor=#fefefe
| 507381 ||  || — || November 4, 2007 || Mount Lemmon || Mount Lemmon Survey ||  || align=right data-sort-value="0.52" | 520 m || 
|-id=382 bgcolor=#E9E9E9
| 507382 ||  || — || June 7, 2008 || Kitt Peak || Spacewatch ||  || align=right | 1.4 km || 
|-id=383 bgcolor=#fefefe
| 507383 ||  || — || February 27, 2012 || Haleakala || Pan-STARRS || (2076) || align=right data-sort-value="0.80" | 800 m || 
|-id=384 bgcolor=#fefefe
| 507384 ||  || — || April 12, 2005 || Kitt Peak || Spacewatch ||  || align=right data-sort-value="0.65" | 650 m || 
|-id=385 bgcolor=#fefefe
| 507385 ||  || — || February 24, 2012 || Kitt Peak || Spacewatch ||  || align=right data-sort-value="0.73" | 730 m || 
|-id=386 bgcolor=#fefefe
| 507386 ||  || — || September 11, 2010 || Mount Lemmon || Mount Lemmon Survey ||  || align=right data-sort-value="0.88" | 880 m || 
|-id=387 bgcolor=#fefefe
| 507387 ||  || — || March 20, 2012 || Haleakala || Pan-STARRS ||  || align=right data-sort-value="0.81" | 810 m || 
|-id=388 bgcolor=#E9E9E9
| 507388 ||  || — || May 2, 2008 || Kitt Peak || Spacewatch ||  || align=right | 3.0 km || 
|-id=389 bgcolor=#fefefe
| 507389 ||  || — || June 10, 2005 || Kitt Peak || Spacewatch || NYS || align=right data-sort-value="0.62" | 620 m || 
|-id=390 bgcolor=#fefefe
| 507390 ||  || — || April 15, 2012 || Haleakala || Pan-STARRS ||  || align=right data-sort-value="0.73" | 730 m || 
|-id=391 bgcolor=#fefefe
| 507391 ||  || — || August 17, 2009 || La Sagra || OAM Obs. ||  || align=right data-sort-value="0.83" | 830 m || 
|-id=392 bgcolor=#fefefe
| 507392 ||  || — || April 13, 2012 || Catalina || CSS ||  || align=right data-sort-value="0.73" | 730 m || 
|-id=393 bgcolor=#fefefe
| 507393 ||  || — || February 8, 2008 || Kitt Peak || Spacewatch || V || align=right data-sort-value="0.54" | 540 m || 
|-id=394 bgcolor=#fefefe
| 507394 ||  || — || March 17, 2012 || Catalina || CSS ||  || align=right | 1.1 km || 
|-id=395 bgcolor=#fefefe
| 507395 ||  || — || April 4, 2005 || Catalina || CSS ||  || align=right data-sort-value="0.58" | 580 m || 
|-id=396 bgcolor=#E9E9E9
| 507396 ||  || — || March 16, 2012 || Kitt Peak || Spacewatch ||  || align=right | 1.4 km || 
|-id=397 bgcolor=#fefefe
| 507397 ||  || — || March 23, 2012 || Kitt Peak || Spacewatch ||  || align=right data-sort-value="0.56" | 560 m || 
|-id=398 bgcolor=#fefefe
| 507398 ||  || — || April 24, 2012 || Mount Lemmon || Mount Lemmon Survey ||  || align=right data-sort-value="0.64" | 640 m || 
|-id=399 bgcolor=#fefefe
| 507399 ||  || — || April 21, 2012 || Mount Lemmon || Mount Lemmon Survey ||  || align=right data-sort-value="0.85" | 850 m || 
|-id=400 bgcolor=#fefefe
| 507400 ||  || — || April 28, 2012 || Mount Lemmon || Mount Lemmon Survey ||  || align=right data-sort-value="0.66" | 660 m || 
|}

507401–507500 

|-bgcolor=#fefefe
| 507401 ||  || — || November 27, 2010 || Mount Lemmon || Mount Lemmon Survey || PHO || align=right data-sort-value="0.90" | 900 m || 
|-id=402 bgcolor=#fefefe
| 507402 ||  || — || April 20, 2012 || Mount Lemmon || Mount Lemmon Survey ||  || align=right data-sort-value="0.58" | 580 m || 
|-id=403 bgcolor=#fefefe
| 507403 ||  || — || November 1, 2010 || Mount Lemmon || Mount Lemmon Survey ||  || align=right data-sort-value="0.62" | 620 m || 
|-id=404 bgcolor=#fefefe
| 507404 ||  || — || May 16, 2012 || Kitt Peak || Spacewatch ||  || align=right data-sort-value="0.79" | 790 m || 
|-id=405 bgcolor=#fefefe
| 507405 ||  || — || April 6, 2008 || Mount Lemmon || Mount Lemmon Survey ||  || align=right data-sort-value="0.72" | 720 m || 
|-id=406 bgcolor=#fefefe
| 507406 ||  || — || September 19, 2009 || Kitt Peak || Spacewatch || NYS || align=right data-sort-value="0.60" | 600 m || 
|-id=407 bgcolor=#fefefe
| 507407 ||  || — || January 28, 2004 || Kitt Peak || Spacewatch || NYS || align=right data-sort-value="0.65" | 650 m || 
|-id=408 bgcolor=#E9E9E9
| 507408 ||  || — || May 7, 2008 || Mount Lemmon || Mount Lemmon Survey ||  || align=right | 1.1 km || 
|-id=409 bgcolor=#E9E9E9
| 507409 ||  || — || November 30, 2005 || Mount Lemmon || Mount Lemmon Survey ||  || align=right data-sort-value="0.96" | 960 m || 
|-id=410 bgcolor=#fefefe
| 507410 ||  || — || May 21, 2012 || Mount Lemmon || Mount Lemmon Survey ||  || align=right data-sort-value="0.78" | 780 m || 
|-id=411 bgcolor=#FA8072
| 507411 ||  || — || December 14, 2004 || Socorro || LINEAR ||  || align=right | 1.7 km || 
|-id=412 bgcolor=#E9E9E9
| 507412 ||  || — || September 16, 2003 || Socorro || LINEAR ||  || align=right | 1.9 km || 
|-id=413 bgcolor=#E9E9E9
| 507413 ||  || — || April 29, 2003 || Socorro || LINEAR ||  || align=right | 1.7 km || 
|-id=414 bgcolor=#FA8072
| 507414 ||  || — || June 20, 2012 || Mount Lemmon || Mount Lemmon Survey ||  || align=right data-sort-value="0.61" | 610 m || 
|-id=415 bgcolor=#E9E9E9
| 507415 ||  || — || August 8, 2012 || Haleakala || Pan-STARRS ||  || align=right | 1.2 km || 
|-id=416 bgcolor=#E9E9E9
| 507416 ||  || — || August 24, 2008 || La Sagra || OAM Obs. || EUN || align=right data-sort-value="0.96" | 960 m || 
|-id=417 bgcolor=#E9E9E9
| 507417 ||  || — || September 4, 2008 || Kitt Peak || Spacewatch ||  || align=right | 1.2 km || 
|-id=418 bgcolor=#E9E9E9
| 507418 ||  || — || October 28, 2008 || Kitt Peak || Spacewatch || AGN || align=right data-sort-value="0.92" | 920 m || 
|-id=419 bgcolor=#E9E9E9
| 507419 ||  || — || November 3, 2004 || Kitt Peak || Spacewatch ||  || align=right | 1.2 km || 
|-id=420 bgcolor=#E9E9E9
| 507420 ||  || — || April 29, 2003 || Kitt Peak || Spacewatch ||  || align=right | 1.5 km || 
|-id=421 bgcolor=#E9E9E9
| 507421 ||  || — || March 9, 2011 || Kitt Peak || Spacewatch ||  || align=right | 2.1 km || 
|-id=422 bgcolor=#FFC2E0
| 507422 ||  || — || August 23, 2012 || La Sagra || OAM Obs. || AMO || align=right data-sort-value="0.34" | 340 m || 
|-id=423 bgcolor=#E9E9E9
| 507423 ||  || — || August 14, 2012 || Kitt Peak || Spacewatch ||  || align=right | 1.3 km || 
|-id=424 bgcolor=#E9E9E9
| 507424 ||  || — || September 22, 2003 || Kitt Peak || Spacewatch ||  || align=right | 1.5 km || 
|-id=425 bgcolor=#E9E9E9
| 507425 ||  || — || August 25, 2012 || Kitt Peak || Spacewatch ||  || align=right | 1.9 km || 
|-id=426 bgcolor=#E9E9E9
| 507426 ||  || — || August 13, 2012 || Kitt Peak || Spacewatch ||  || align=right | 2.0 km || 
|-id=427 bgcolor=#E9E9E9
| 507427 ||  || — || May 31, 2011 || Mount Lemmon || Mount Lemmon Survey ||  || align=right | 2.2 km || 
|-id=428 bgcolor=#E9E9E9
| 507428 ||  || — || November 20, 2003 || Kitt Peak || Spacewatch ||  || align=right | 1.9 km || 
|-id=429 bgcolor=#E9E9E9
| 507429 ||  || — || November 19, 2008 || Mount Lemmon || Mount Lemmon Survey ||  || align=right | 2.0 km || 
|-id=430 bgcolor=#E9E9E9
| 507430 ||  || — || May 6, 2011 || Mount Lemmon || Mount Lemmon Survey ||  || align=right | 1.9 km || 
|-id=431 bgcolor=#E9E9E9
| 507431 ||  || — || October 21, 2003 || Kitt Peak || Spacewatch || DOR || align=right | 2.5 km || 
|-id=432 bgcolor=#E9E9E9
| 507432 ||  || — || October 6, 1999 || Kitt Peak || Spacewatch ||  || align=right | 1.9 km || 
|-id=433 bgcolor=#d6d6d6
| 507433 ||  || — || September 15, 2012 || La Sagra || OAM Obs. ||  || align=right | 3.2 km || 
|-id=434 bgcolor=#E9E9E9
| 507434 ||  || — || April 30, 2006 || Kitt Peak || Spacewatch ||  || align=right | 2.1 km || 
|-id=435 bgcolor=#E9E9E9
| 507435 ||  || — || February 27, 2006 || Kitt Peak || Spacewatch ||  || align=right | 1.9 km || 
|-id=436 bgcolor=#E9E9E9
| 507436 ||  || — || September 16, 2012 || Kitt Peak || Spacewatch ||  || align=right | 1.3 km || 
|-id=437 bgcolor=#E9E9E9
| 507437 ||  || — || September 17, 2012 || Mount Lemmon || Mount Lemmon Survey ||  || align=right | 1.8 km || 
|-id=438 bgcolor=#d6d6d6
| 507438 ||  || — || September 17, 2012 || Mount Lemmon || Mount Lemmon Survey ||  || align=right | 1.9 km || 
|-id=439 bgcolor=#d6d6d6
| 507439 ||  || — || October 16, 2007 || Kitt Peak || Spacewatch ||  || align=right | 1.8 km || 
|-id=440 bgcolor=#E9E9E9
| 507440 ||  || — || September 21, 2012 || La Sagra || OAM Obs. || EUN || align=right | 1.3 km || 
|-id=441 bgcolor=#E9E9E9
| 507441 ||  || — || May 24, 2011 || Haleakala || Pan-STARRS || HOF || align=right | 2.1 km || 
|-id=442 bgcolor=#E9E9E9
| 507442 ||  || — || October 12, 1998 || Kitt Peak || Spacewatch ||  || align=right | 2.3 km || 
|-id=443 bgcolor=#E9E9E9
| 507443 ||  || — || August 25, 2012 || Haleakala || Pan-STARRS ||  || align=right | 2.1 km || 
|-id=444 bgcolor=#d6d6d6
| 507444 ||  || — || March 14, 2010 || Mount Lemmon || Mount Lemmon Survey || KOR || align=right | 1.2 km || 
|-id=445 bgcolor=#E9E9E9
| 507445 ||  || — || October 12, 2007 || Mount Lemmon || Mount Lemmon Survey ||  || align=right | 2.1 km || 
|-id=446 bgcolor=#E9E9E9
| 507446 ||  || — || September 4, 2007 || Mount Lemmon || Mount Lemmon Survey ||  || align=right | 1.8 km || 
|-id=447 bgcolor=#E9E9E9
| 507447 ||  || — || October 21, 2003 || Kitt Peak || Spacewatch ||  || align=right | 2.2 km || 
|-id=448 bgcolor=#E9E9E9
| 507448 ||  || — || September 24, 2012 || Kitt Peak || Spacewatch || HOF || align=right | 2.6 km || 
|-id=449 bgcolor=#E9E9E9
| 507449 ||  || — || May 3, 2011 || Mount Lemmon || Mount Lemmon Survey ||  || align=right | 1.9 km || 
|-id=450 bgcolor=#d6d6d6
| 507450 ||  || — || October 6, 2012 || Kitt Peak || Spacewatch ||  || align=right | 2.5 km || 
|-id=451 bgcolor=#E9E9E9
| 507451 ||  || — || March 15, 2010 || Mount Lemmon || Mount Lemmon Survey ||  || align=right | 1.7 km || 
|-id=452 bgcolor=#d6d6d6
| 507452 ||  || — || September 11, 2007 || Mount Lemmon || Mount Lemmon Survey || KOR || align=right | 1.2 km || 
|-id=453 bgcolor=#d6d6d6
| 507453 ||  || — || September 13, 2007 || Mount Lemmon || Mount Lemmon Survey || KOR || align=right data-sort-value="0.98" | 980 m || 
|-id=454 bgcolor=#E9E9E9
| 507454 ||  || — || September 11, 2012 || Siding Spring || SSS ||  || align=right | 1.4 km || 
|-id=455 bgcolor=#d6d6d6
| 507455 ||  || — || June 4, 2011 || Mount Lemmon || Mount Lemmon Survey ||  || align=right | 3.0 km || 
|-id=456 bgcolor=#E9E9E9
| 507456 ||  || — || October 13, 1998 || Kitt Peak || Spacewatch ||  || align=right | 1.5 km || 
|-id=457 bgcolor=#E9E9E9
| 507457 ||  || — || February 21, 2006 || Mount Lemmon || Mount Lemmon Survey ||  || align=right | 1.7 km || 
|-id=458 bgcolor=#E9E9E9
| 507458 ||  || — || August 10, 2007 || Kitt Peak || Spacewatch ||  || align=right | 2.3 km || 
|-id=459 bgcolor=#d6d6d6
| 507459 ||  || — || August 26, 2012 || Haleakala || Pan-STARRS ||  || align=right | 1.9 km || 
|-id=460 bgcolor=#E9E9E9
| 507460 ||  || — || September 15, 2012 || La Sagra || OAM Obs. || JUN || align=right | 1.2 km || 
|-id=461 bgcolor=#d6d6d6
| 507461 ||  || — || September 4, 2007 || Catalina || CSS || KOR || align=right | 1.1 km || 
|-id=462 bgcolor=#E9E9E9
| 507462 ||  || — || October 8, 2012 || Haleakala || Pan-STARRS ||  || align=right | 1.9 km || 
|-id=463 bgcolor=#d6d6d6
| 507463 ||  || — || October 8, 2012 || Haleakala || Pan-STARRS ||  || align=right | 2.0 km || 
|-id=464 bgcolor=#E9E9E9
| 507464 ||  || — || September 17, 2012 || Kitt Peak || Spacewatch || HOF || align=right | 2.3 km || 
|-id=465 bgcolor=#d6d6d6
| 507465 ||  || — || September 12, 2007 || Mount Lemmon || Mount Lemmon Survey || KOR || align=right | 1.1 km || 
|-id=466 bgcolor=#E9E9E9
| 507466 ||  || — || November 14, 1998 || Kitt Peak || Spacewatch ||  || align=right | 1.9 km || 
|-id=467 bgcolor=#E9E9E9
| 507467 ||  || — || October 11, 2012 || Kitt Peak || Spacewatch || GEF || align=right | 1.2 km || 
|-id=468 bgcolor=#E9E9E9
| 507468 ||  || — || September 21, 2003 || Kitt Peak || Spacewatch ||  || align=right | 1.4 km || 
|-id=469 bgcolor=#FA8072
| 507469 ||  || — || April 24, 2011 || Mount Lemmon || Mount Lemmon Survey || H || align=right data-sort-value="0.53" | 530 m || 
|-id=470 bgcolor=#E9E9E9
| 507470 ||  || — || October 8, 2012 || Mount Lemmon || Mount Lemmon Survey ||  || align=right | 1.9 km || 
|-id=471 bgcolor=#E9E9E9
| 507471 ||  || — || December 31, 2008 || XuYi || PMO NEO ||  || align=right | 1.8 km || 
|-id=472 bgcolor=#d6d6d6
| 507472 ||  || — || October 8, 2012 || Mount Lemmon || Mount Lemmon Survey ||  || align=right | 2.0 km || 
|-id=473 bgcolor=#E9E9E9
| 507473 ||  || — || August 24, 2012 || Kitt Peak || Spacewatch ||  || align=right | 1.8 km || 
|-id=474 bgcolor=#E9E9E9
| 507474 ||  || — || September 19, 2012 || Mount Lemmon || Mount Lemmon Survey ||  || align=right | 1.7 km || 
|-id=475 bgcolor=#d6d6d6
| 507475 ||  || — || September 19, 2001 || Socorro || LINEAR ||  || align=right | 2.3 km || 
|-id=476 bgcolor=#E9E9E9
| 507476 ||  || — || October 7, 2012 || Haleakala || Pan-STARRS ||  || align=right | 1.7 km || 
|-id=477 bgcolor=#d6d6d6
| 507477 ||  || — || February 16, 2010 || Kitt Peak || Spacewatch || KOR || align=right | 1.1 km || 
|-id=478 bgcolor=#d6d6d6
| 507478 ||  || — || October 9, 2007 || Kitt Peak || Spacewatch ||  || align=right | 1.8 km || 
|-id=479 bgcolor=#d6d6d6
| 507479 ||  || — || October 10, 2012 || Mount Lemmon || Mount Lemmon Survey ||  || align=right | 2.6 km || 
|-id=480 bgcolor=#d6d6d6
| 507480 ||  || — || December 29, 2008 || Mount Lemmon || Mount Lemmon Survey ||  || align=right | 1.8 km || 
|-id=481 bgcolor=#d6d6d6
| 507481 ||  || — || January 29, 2009 || Mount Lemmon || Mount Lemmon Survey ||  || align=right | 3.1 km || 
|-id=482 bgcolor=#E9E9E9
| 507482 ||  || — || September 25, 2012 || Mount Lemmon || Mount Lemmon Survey ||  || align=right | 1.9 km || 
|-id=483 bgcolor=#E9E9E9
| 507483 ||  || — || October 9, 2012 || Mount Lemmon || Mount Lemmon Survey ||  || align=right | 1.8 km || 
|-id=484 bgcolor=#E9E9E9
| 507484 ||  || — || October 6, 2012 || Haleakala || Pan-STARRS ||  || align=right | 1.2 km || 
|-id=485 bgcolor=#E9E9E9
| 507485 ||  || — || January 7, 2000 || Kitt Peak || Spacewatch || AGN || align=right | 1.1 km || 
|-id=486 bgcolor=#E9E9E9
| 507486 ||  || — || October 8, 2012 || Mount Lemmon || Mount Lemmon Survey ||  || align=right | 1.6 km || 
|-id=487 bgcolor=#E9E9E9
| 507487 ||  || — || October 16, 2012 || Mount Lemmon || Mount Lemmon Survey ||  || align=right | 1.6 km || 
|-id=488 bgcolor=#E9E9E9
| 507488 ||  || — || February 2, 2005 || Kitt Peak || Spacewatch || AGN || align=right | 1.1 km || 
|-id=489 bgcolor=#d6d6d6
| 507489 ||  || — || October 16, 2012 || Kitt Peak || Spacewatch ||  || align=right | 2.9 km || 
|-id=490 bgcolor=#E9E9E9
| 507490 Possum ||  ||  || October 9, 2012 || Catalina || CSS ||  || align=right | 2.4 km || 
|-id=491 bgcolor=#E9E9E9
| 507491 ||  || — || October 18, 2012 || Mount Lemmon || Mount Lemmon Survey ||  || align=right | 2.7 km || 
|-id=492 bgcolor=#E9E9E9
| 507492 ||  || — || October 19, 2012 || Haleakala || Pan-STARRS ||  || align=right | 2.0 km || 
|-id=493 bgcolor=#d6d6d6
| 507493 ||  || — || October 8, 2007 || Mount Lemmon || Mount Lemmon Survey || KOR || align=right | 1.1 km || 
|-id=494 bgcolor=#E9E9E9
| 507494 ||  || — || October 8, 2012 || Haleakala || Pan-STARRS ||  || align=right | 1.5 km || 
|-id=495 bgcolor=#E9E9E9
| 507495 ||  || — || October 17, 2012 || Haleakala || Pan-STARRS || GEF || align=right | 1.1 km || 
|-id=496 bgcolor=#fefefe
| 507496 ||  || — || April 24, 2006 || Mount Lemmon || Mount Lemmon Survey || H || align=right data-sort-value="0.49" | 490 m || 
|-id=497 bgcolor=#E9E9E9
| 507497 ||  || — || October 9, 2012 || Mount Lemmon || Mount Lemmon Survey ||  || align=right | 2.1 km || 
|-id=498 bgcolor=#E9E9E9
| 507498 ||  || — || September 10, 2007 || Kitt Peak || Spacewatch ||  || align=right | 1.7 km || 
|-id=499 bgcolor=#d6d6d6
| 507499 ||  || — || September 11, 2007 || Mount Lemmon || Mount Lemmon Survey || KOR || align=right | 1.1 km || 
|-id=500 bgcolor=#E9E9E9
| 507500 ||  || — || October 18, 2012 || Haleakala || Pan-STARRS ||  || align=right | 2.5 km || 
|}

507501–507600 

|-bgcolor=#E9E9E9
| 507501 ||  || — || October 18, 2012 || Haleakala || Pan-STARRS ||  || align=right | 2.0 km || 
|-id=502 bgcolor=#d6d6d6
| 507502 ||  || — || October 14, 2012 || Kitt Peak || Spacewatch ||  || align=right | 2.8 km || 
|-id=503 bgcolor=#fefefe
| 507503 ||  || — || September 16, 2004 || Anderson Mesa || LONEOS || H || align=right data-sort-value="0.59" | 590 m || 
|-id=504 bgcolor=#d6d6d6
| 507504 ||  || — || October 22, 2012 || Haleakala || Pan-STARRS || BRA || align=right | 1.0 km || 
|-id=505 bgcolor=#E9E9E9
| 507505 ||  || — || October 17, 2003 || Kitt Peak || Spacewatch ||  || align=right | 1.3 km || 
|-id=506 bgcolor=#d6d6d6
| 507506 ||  || — || October 20, 2007 || Mount Lemmon || Mount Lemmon Survey ||  || align=right | 2.5 km || 
|-id=507 bgcolor=#d6d6d6
| 507507 ||  || — || November 4, 2012 || Mount Lemmon || Mount Lemmon Survey ||  || align=right | 1.8 km || 
|-id=508 bgcolor=#E9E9E9
| 507508 ||  || — || September 10, 2007 || Mount Lemmon || Mount Lemmon Survey ||  || align=right | 1.6 km || 
|-id=509 bgcolor=#d6d6d6
| 507509 ||  || — || September 12, 2007 || Mount Lemmon || Mount Lemmon Survey || KOR || align=right | 1.0 km || 
|-id=510 bgcolor=#d6d6d6
| 507510 ||  || — || October 18, 2007 || Mount Lemmon || Mount Lemmon Survey ||  || align=right | 2.0 km || 
|-id=511 bgcolor=#d6d6d6
| 507511 ||  || — || October 30, 2007 || Mount Lemmon || Mount Lemmon Survey ||  || align=right | 1.9 km || 
|-id=512 bgcolor=#d6d6d6
| 507512 ||  || — || September 10, 2007 || Kitt Peak || Spacewatch ||  || align=right | 2.2 km || 
|-id=513 bgcolor=#d6d6d6
| 507513 ||  || — || November 20, 2001 || Socorro || LINEAR ||  || align=right | 2.7 km || 
|-id=514 bgcolor=#E9E9E9
| 507514 ||  || — || April 9, 2010 || Kitt Peak || Spacewatch ||  || align=right | 2.0 km || 
|-id=515 bgcolor=#E9E9E9
| 507515 ||  || — || October 17, 2012 || Haleakala || Pan-STARRS ||  || align=right | 1.9 km || 
|-id=516 bgcolor=#E9E9E9
| 507516 ||  || — || March 8, 2005 || Mount Lemmon || Mount Lemmon Survey || HOF || align=right | 2.2 km || 
|-id=517 bgcolor=#d6d6d6
| 507517 ||  || — || October 30, 2007 || Kitt Peak || Spacewatch || KOR || align=right | 1.2 km || 
|-id=518 bgcolor=#d6d6d6
| 507518 ||  || — || December 4, 2007 || Kitt Peak || Spacewatch ||  || align=right | 2.0 km || 
|-id=519 bgcolor=#fefefe
| 507519 ||  || — || March 26, 2011 || Catalina || CSS || H || align=right data-sort-value="0.77" | 770 m || 
|-id=520 bgcolor=#d6d6d6
| 507520 ||  || — || October 20, 2007 || Mount Lemmon || Mount Lemmon Survey ||  || align=right | 2.1 km || 
|-id=521 bgcolor=#d6d6d6
| 507521 ||  || — || May 13, 2009 || Kitt Peak || Spacewatch ||  || align=right | 2.7 km || 
|-id=522 bgcolor=#d6d6d6
| 507522 ||  || — || November 3, 2007 || Kitt Peak || Spacewatch ||  || align=right | 3.3 km || 
|-id=523 bgcolor=#fefefe
| 507523 ||  || — || October 19, 2007 || Mount Lemmon || Mount Lemmon Survey || H || align=right data-sort-value="0.83" | 830 m || 
|-id=524 bgcolor=#d6d6d6
| 507524 ||  || — || August 2, 2011 || Haleakala || Pan-STARRS ||  || align=right | 3.0 km || 
|-id=525 bgcolor=#d6d6d6
| 507525 ||  || — || November 19, 2007 || Kitt Peak || Spacewatch ||  || align=right | 2.7 km || 
|-id=526 bgcolor=#d6d6d6
| 507526 ||  || — || November 12, 2012 || Mount Lemmon || Mount Lemmon Survey ||  || align=right | 2.3 km || 
|-id=527 bgcolor=#d6d6d6
| 507527 ||  || — || October 21, 2007 || Kitt Peak || Spacewatch ||  || align=right | 2.2 km || 
|-id=528 bgcolor=#d6d6d6
| 507528 ||  || — || October 23, 2012 || Mount Lemmon || Mount Lemmon Survey ||  || align=right | 3.3 km || 
|-id=529 bgcolor=#d6d6d6
| 507529 ||  || — || November 17, 2012 || Mount Lemmon || Mount Lemmon Survey || EOS || align=right | 1.4 km || 
|-id=530 bgcolor=#E9E9E9
| 507530 ||  || — || October 13, 2007 || Mount Lemmon || Mount Lemmon Survey ||  || align=right | 1.6 km || 
|-id=531 bgcolor=#d6d6d6
| 507531 ||  || — || November 5, 2012 || Kitt Peak || Spacewatch ||  || align=right | 2.2 km || 
|-id=532 bgcolor=#d6d6d6
| 507532 ||  || — || December 4, 2007 || Kitt Peak || Spacewatch ||  || align=right | 1.8 km || 
|-id=533 bgcolor=#d6d6d6
| 507533 ||  || — || November 4, 2007 || Mount Lemmon || Mount Lemmon Survey ||  || align=right | 2.7 km || 
|-id=534 bgcolor=#fefefe
| 507534 ||  || — || May 31, 2006 || Mount Lemmon || Mount Lemmon Survey || H || align=right data-sort-value="0.59" | 590 m || 
|-id=535 bgcolor=#d6d6d6
| 507535 ||  || — || October 8, 2007 || Mount Lemmon || Mount Lemmon Survey || KOR || align=right | 1.2 km || 
|-id=536 bgcolor=#d6d6d6
| 507536 ||  || — || September 19, 2011 || Haleakala || Pan-STARRS ||  || align=right | 3.0 km || 
|-id=537 bgcolor=#d6d6d6
| 507537 ||  || — || December 4, 2007 || Mount Lemmon || Mount Lemmon Survey ||  || align=right | 2.2 km || 
|-id=538 bgcolor=#d6d6d6
| 507538 ||  || — || December 16, 2007 || Kitt Peak || Spacewatch ||  || align=right | 2.0 km || 
|-id=539 bgcolor=#d6d6d6
| 507539 ||  || — || November 26, 2012 || Mount Lemmon || Mount Lemmon Survey ||  || align=right | 3.0 km || 
|-id=540 bgcolor=#fefefe
| 507540 ||  || — || December 9, 2012 || Haleakala || Pan-STARRS || H || align=right data-sort-value="0.61" | 610 m || 
|-id=541 bgcolor=#d6d6d6
| 507541 ||  || — || October 21, 2012 || Haleakala || Pan-STARRS ||  || align=right | 1.8 km || 
|-id=542 bgcolor=#d6d6d6
| 507542 ||  || — || September 17, 2006 || Kitt Peak || Spacewatch ||  || align=right | 2.7 km || 
|-id=543 bgcolor=#d6d6d6
| 507543 ||  || — || December 6, 2012 || Mount Lemmon || Mount Lemmon Survey ||  || align=right | 2.1 km || 
|-id=544 bgcolor=#d6d6d6
| 507544 ||  || — || November 7, 2012 || Mount Lemmon || Mount Lemmon Survey ||  || align=right | 1.9 km || 
|-id=545 bgcolor=#d6d6d6
| 507545 ||  || — || November 13, 2012 || Kitt Peak || Spacewatch ||  || align=right | 2.5 km || 
|-id=546 bgcolor=#d6d6d6
| 507546 ||  || — || September 19, 2011 || Haleakala || Pan-STARRS ||  || align=right | 3.6 km || 
|-id=547 bgcolor=#d6d6d6
| 507547 ||  || — || November 5, 2007 || Mount Lemmon || Mount Lemmon Survey ||  || align=right | 2.3 km || 
|-id=548 bgcolor=#E9E9E9
| 507548 ||  || — || December 7, 2012 || Haleakala || Pan-STARRS ||  || align=right | 2.5 km || 
|-id=549 bgcolor=#fefefe
| 507549 ||  || — || November 27, 2012 || Mount Lemmon || Mount Lemmon Survey || H || align=right data-sort-value="0.72" | 720 m || 
|-id=550 bgcolor=#d6d6d6
| 507550 ||  || — || November 26, 2012 || Mount Lemmon || Mount Lemmon Survey || EOS || align=right | 2.0 km || 
|-id=551 bgcolor=#d6d6d6
| 507551 ||  || — || December 4, 2012 || Mount Lemmon || Mount Lemmon Survey || EOS || align=right | 1.9 km || 
|-id=552 bgcolor=#d6d6d6
| 507552 ||  || — || December 31, 2007 || Kitt Peak || Spacewatch ||  || align=right | 3.1 km || 
|-id=553 bgcolor=#fefefe
| 507553 ||  || — || December 9, 2012 || Mount Lemmon || Mount Lemmon Survey || H || align=right data-sort-value="0.68" | 680 m || 
|-id=554 bgcolor=#d6d6d6
| 507554 ||  || — || November 9, 2007 || Mount Lemmon || Mount Lemmon Survey ||  || align=right | 2.8 km || 
|-id=555 bgcolor=#fefefe
| 507555 ||  || — || December 23, 2012 || Mount Lemmon || Mount Lemmon Survey ||  || align=right data-sort-value="0.98" | 980 m || 
|-id=556 bgcolor=#d6d6d6
| 507556 ||  || — || January 19, 1996 || Kitt Peak || Spacewatch ||  || align=right | 2.2 km || 
|-id=557 bgcolor=#d6d6d6
| 507557 ||  || — || December 9, 2012 || Haleakala || Pan-STARRS || Tj (2.92) || align=right | 2.4 km || 
|-id=558 bgcolor=#d6d6d6
| 507558 ||  || — || December 21, 2012 || Mount Lemmon || Mount Lemmon Survey ||  || align=right | 3.8 km || 
|-id=559 bgcolor=#fefefe
| 507559 ||  || — || April 30, 2011 || Haleakala || Pan-STARRS || H || align=right data-sort-value="0.59" | 590 m || 
|-id=560 bgcolor=#d6d6d6
| 507560 ||  || — || September 27, 2011 || Mount Lemmon || Mount Lemmon Survey ||  || align=right | 3.0 km || 
|-id=561 bgcolor=#FA8072
| 507561 ||  || — || November 18, 2007 || Mount Lemmon || Mount Lemmon Survey || H || align=right data-sort-value="0.65" | 650 m || 
|-id=562 bgcolor=#d6d6d6
| 507562 ||  || — || December 13, 2006 || Mount Lemmon || Mount Lemmon Survey || LUT || align=right | 3.5 km || 
|-id=563 bgcolor=#d6d6d6
| 507563 ||  || — || January 5, 2013 || Mount Lemmon || Mount Lemmon Survey || 7:4 || align=right | 3.0 km || 
|-id=564 bgcolor=#d6d6d6
| 507564 ||  || — || February 26, 2008 || Mount Lemmon || Mount Lemmon Survey ||  || align=right | 2.6 km || 
|-id=565 bgcolor=#fefefe
| 507565 ||  || — || December 20, 2012 || Catalina || CSS || H || align=right data-sort-value="0.64" | 640 m || 
|-id=566 bgcolor=#fefefe
| 507566 ||  || — || January 6, 2013 || Kitt Peak || Spacewatch || H || align=right data-sort-value="0.64" | 640 m || 
|-id=567 bgcolor=#d6d6d6
| 507567 ||  || — || December 22, 2012 || Haleakala || Pan-STARRS ||  || align=right | 2.8 km || 
|-id=568 bgcolor=#d6d6d6
| 507568 ||  || — || December 9, 2012 || Kitt Peak || Spacewatch ||  || align=right | 2.9 km || 
|-id=569 bgcolor=#d6d6d6
| 507569 ||  || — || March 3, 2008 || Catalina || CSS ||  || align=right | 2.8 km || 
|-id=570 bgcolor=#d6d6d6
| 507570 ||  || — || December 12, 2012 || Mount Lemmon || Mount Lemmon Survey ||  || align=right | 2.9 km || 
|-id=571 bgcolor=#d6d6d6
| 507571 ||  || — || November 13, 2012 || Mount Lemmon || Mount Lemmon Survey ||  || align=right | 2.7 km || 
|-id=572 bgcolor=#d6d6d6
| 507572 ||  || — || January 4, 2013 || Kitt Peak || Spacewatch ||  || align=right | 2.8 km || 
|-id=573 bgcolor=#d6d6d6
| 507573 ||  || — || October 23, 2011 || Mount Lemmon || Mount Lemmon Survey ||  || align=right | 2.5 km || 
|-id=574 bgcolor=#d6d6d6
| 507574 ||  || — || September 23, 2011 || Haleakala || Pan-STARRS || HYG || align=right | 2.4 km || 
|-id=575 bgcolor=#d6d6d6
| 507575 ||  || — || September 19, 2011 || Haleakala || Pan-STARRS || EMA || align=right | 3.1 km || 
|-id=576 bgcolor=#d6d6d6
| 507576 ||  || — || November 11, 2006 || Kitt Peak || Spacewatch || THM || align=right | 1.9 km || 
|-id=577 bgcolor=#d6d6d6
| 507577 ||  || — || September 2, 2010 || Mount Lemmon || Mount Lemmon Survey ||  || align=right | 2.6 km || 
|-id=578 bgcolor=#d6d6d6
| 507578 ||  || — || September 23, 2011 || Kitt Peak || Spacewatch ||  || align=right | 2.0 km || 
|-id=579 bgcolor=#fefefe
| 507579 ||  || — || December 11, 2004 || Socorro || LINEAR || H || align=right data-sort-value="0.67" | 670 m || 
|-id=580 bgcolor=#d6d6d6
| 507580 ||  || — || October 20, 2006 || Kitt Peak || Spacewatch ||  || align=right | 1.3 km || 
|-id=581 bgcolor=#d6d6d6
| 507581 ||  || — || February 9, 2008 || Kitt Peak || Spacewatch ||  || align=right | 1.9 km || 
|-id=582 bgcolor=#d6d6d6
| 507582 ||  || — || September 30, 2005 || Kitt Peak || Spacewatch ||  || align=right | 2.1 km || 
|-id=583 bgcolor=#d6d6d6
| 507583 ||  || — || September 29, 2011 || Mount Lemmon || Mount Lemmon Survey ||  || align=right | 2.1 km || 
|-id=584 bgcolor=#d6d6d6
| 507584 ||  || — || April 11, 2008 || Mount Lemmon || Mount Lemmon Survey ||  || align=right | 2.3 km || 
|-id=585 bgcolor=#d6d6d6
| 507585 ||  || — || February 27, 2008 || Mount Lemmon || Mount Lemmon Survey ||  || align=right | 1.9 km || 
|-id=586 bgcolor=#d6d6d6
| 507586 ||  || — || October 21, 2012 || Mount Lemmon || Mount Lemmon Survey ||  || align=right | 2.7 km || 
|-id=587 bgcolor=#d6d6d6
| 507587 ||  || — || September 4, 2011 || Haleakala || Pan-STARRS ||  || align=right | 2.3 km || 
|-id=588 bgcolor=#fefefe
| 507588 ||  || — || August 21, 2003 || Campo Imperatore || CINEOS || H || align=right data-sort-value="0.71" | 710 m || 
|-id=589 bgcolor=#fefefe
| 507589 ||  || — || January 17, 2013 || Haleakala || Pan-STARRS || H || align=right data-sort-value="0.79" | 790 m || 
|-id=590 bgcolor=#d6d6d6
| 507590 ||  || — || January 10, 2007 || Mount Lemmon || Mount Lemmon Survey ||  || align=right | 2.5 km || 
|-id=591 bgcolor=#d6d6d6
| 507591 ||  || — || January 7, 2013 || Kitt Peak || Spacewatch || VER || align=right | 2.8 km || 
|-id=592 bgcolor=#fefefe
| 507592 ||  || — || January 17, 2013 || Kitt Peak || Spacewatch || H || align=right data-sort-value="0.57" | 570 m || 
|-id=593 bgcolor=#d6d6d6
| 507593 ||  || — || February 10, 2008 || Mount Lemmon || Mount Lemmon Survey ||  || align=right | 2.2 km || 
|-id=594 bgcolor=#d6d6d6
| 507594 ||  || — || January 10, 2013 || Haleakala || Pan-STARRS ||  || align=right | 2.7 km || 
|-id=595 bgcolor=#d6d6d6
| 507595 ||  || — || December 21, 2006 || Kitt Peak || Spacewatch ||  || align=right | 2.6 km || 
|-id=596 bgcolor=#fefefe
| 507596 ||  || — || January 21, 2013 || Catalina || CSS || H || align=right data-sort-value="0.74" | 740 m || 
|-id=597 bgcolor=#fefefe
| 507597 ||  || — || February 28, 2008 || Catalina || CSS || H || align=right data-sort-value="0.75" | 750 m || 
|-id=598 bgcolor=#d6d6d6
| 507598 ||  || — || December 20, 2006 || Catalina || CSS ||  || align=right | 3.7 km || 
|-id=599 bgcolor=#d6d6d6
| 507599 ||  || — || January 10, 2013 || Haleakala || Pan-STARRS ||  || align=right | 2.9 km || 
|-id=600 bgcolor=#d6d6d6
| 507600 ||  || — || December 21, 2012 || Mount Lemmon || Mount Lemmon Survey ||  || align=right | 2.9 km || 
|}

507601–507700 

|-bgcolor=#d6d6d6
| 507601 ||  || — || January 19, 2013 || Kitt Peak || Spacewatch ||  || align=right | 3.0 km || 
|-id=602 bgcolor=#d6d6d6
| 507602 ||  || — || October 24, 2011 || Haleakala || Pan-STARRS || 7:4 || align=right | 2.7 km || 
|-id=603 bgcolor=#d6d6d6
| 507603 ||  || — || October 8, 2005 || Kitt Peak || Spacewatch ||  || align=right | 2.4 km || 
|-id=604 bgcolor=#d6d6d6
| 507604 ||  || — || January 10, 2013 || Haleakala || Pan-STARRS || Tj (2.93) || align=right | 3.3 km || 
|-id=605 bgcolor=#d6d6d6
| 507605 ||  || — || November 19, 2006 || Kitt Peak || Spacewatch || LIX || align=right | 4.0 km || 
|-id=606 bgcolor=#d6d6d6
| 507606 ||  || — || April 29, 2008 || Mount Lemmon || Mount Lemmon Survey ||  || align=right | 2.8 km || 
|-id=607 bgcolor=#d6d6d6
| 507607 ||  || — || October 18, 2000 || Kitt Peak || Spacewatch ||  || align=right | 2.0 km || 
|-id=608 bgcolor=#d6d6d6
| 507608 ||  || — || September 24, 2011 || Haleakala || Pan-STARRS ||  || align=right | 2.2 km || 
|-id=609 bgcolor=#d6d6d6
| 507609 ||  || — || August 28, 2005 || Kitt Peak || Spacewatch ||  || align=right | 2.5 km || 
|-id=610 bgcolor=#fefefe
| 507610 ||  || — || January 19, 2013 || Kitt Peak || Spacewatch || H || align=right data-sort-value="0.46" | 460 m || 
|-id=611 bgcolor=#d6d6d6
| 507611 ||  || — || November 18, 2006 || Catalina || CSS ||  || align=right | 2.2 km || 
|-id=612 bgcolor=#fefefe
| 507612 ||  || — || June 2, 2011 || Haleakala || Pan-STARRS || H || align=right data-sort-value="0.57" | 570 m || 
|-id=613 bgcolor=#d6d6d6
| 507613 ||  || — || August 29, 2005 || Anderson Mesa || LONEOS ||  || align=right | 3.4 km || 
|-id=614 bgcolor=#d6d6d6
| 507614 ||  || — || April 29, 2008 || Mount Lemmon || Mount Lemmon Survey ||  || align=right | 2.9 km || 
|-id=615 bgcolor=#d6d6d6
| 507615 ||  || — || September 24, 2011 || Haleakala || Pan-STARRS ||  || align=right | 2.5 km || 
|-id=616 bgcolor=#d6d6d6
| 507616 ||  || — || September 24, 2011 || Haleakala || Pan-STARRS ||  || align=right | 2.1 km || 
|-id=617 bgcolor=#d6d6d6
| 507617 ||  || — || October 9, 2005 || Kitt Peak || Spacewatch || HYG || align=right | 2.2 km || 
|-id=618 bgcolor=#d6d6d6
| 507618 ||  || — || August 21, 2008 || Kitt Peak || Spacewatch || 3:2 || align=right | 5.9 km || 
|-id=619 bgcolor=#d6d6d6
| 507619 ||  || — || September 10, 2004 || Kitt Peak || Spacewatch || 7:4 || align=right | 3.1 km || 
|-id=620 bgcolor=#d6d6d6
| 507620 ||  || — || October 22, 2005 || Kitt Peak || Spacewatch ||  || align=right | 2.9 km || 
|-id=621 bgcolor=#fefefe
| 507621 ||  || — || January 19, 2013 || Mount Lemmon || Mount Lemmon Survey || H || align=right data-sort-value="0.68" | 680 m || 
|-id=622 bgcolor=#d6d6d6
| 507622 ||  || — || January 17, 2007 || Kitt Peak || Spacewatch || THM || align=right | 2.3 km || 
|-id=623 bgcolor=#d6d6d6
| 507623 ||  || — || October 1, 2005 || Mount Lemmon || Mount Lemmon Survey ||  || align=right | 2.3 km || 
|-id=624 bgcolor=#fefefe
| 507624 ||  || — || December 7, 2001 || Socorro || LINEAR || H || align=right data-sort-value="0.75" | 750 m || 
|-id=625 bgcolor=#fefefe
| 507625 ||  || — || March 19, 2013 || Haleakala || Pan-STARRS ||  || align=right data-sort-value="0.62" | 620 m || 
|-id=626 bgcolor=#fefefe
| 507626 ||  || — || April 12, 2013 || Haleakala || Pan-STARRS || H || align=right data-sort-value="0.79" | 790 m || 
|-id=627 bgcolor=#d6d6d6
| 507627 ||  || — || March 5, 2013 || Haleakala || Pan-STARRS || HYG || align=right | 3.3 km || 
|-id=628 bgcolor=#d6d6d6
| 507628 ||  || — || April 13, 2013 || Haleakala || Pan-STARRS || THB || align=right | 2.9 km || 
|-id=629 bgcolor=#fefefe
| 507629 ||  || — || March 14, 2013 || Kitt Peak || Spacewatch ||  || align=right data-sort-value="0.60" | 600 m || 
|-id=630 bgcolor=#d6d6d6
| 507630 ||  || — || December 29, 2011 || Kitt Peak || Spacewatch ||  || align=right | 2.4 km || 
|-id=631 bgcolor=#fefefe
| 507631 ||  || — || October 25, 2011 || Haleakala || Pan-STARRS ||  || align=right data-sort-value="0.45" | 450 m || 
|-id=632 bgcolor=#fefefe
| 507632 ||  || — || April 1, 2013 || Mount Lemmon || Mount Lemmon Survey || H || align=right data-sort-value="0.77" | 770 m || 
|-id=633 bgcolor=#fefefe
| 507633 ||  || — || October 15, 2007 || Mount Lemmon || Mount Lemmon Survey ||  || align=right data-sort-value="0.69" | 690 m || 
|-id=634 bgcolor=#d6d6d6
| 507634 ||  || — || May 6, 2002 || Kitt Peak || Spacewatch ||  || align=right | 3.2 km || 
|-id=635 bgcolor=#fefefe
| 507635 ||  || — || November 24, 2003 || Kitt Peak || Spacewatch || H || align=right data-sort-value="0.51" | 510 m || 
|-id=636 bgcolor=#fefefe
| 507636 ||  || — || November 4, 2010 || Mount Lemmon || Mount Lemmon Survey ||  || align=right data-sort-value="0.62" | 620 m || 
|-id=637 bgcolor=#fefefe
| 507637 ||  || — || February 14, 2013 || Haleakala || Pan-STARRS ||  || align=right data-sort-value="0.98" | 980 m || 
|-id=638 bgcolor=#fefefe
| 507638 ||  || — || May 8, 2013 || Haleakala || Pan-STARRS ||  || align=right data-sort-value="0.54" | 540 m || 
|-id=639 bgcolor=#FA8072
| 507639 ||  || — || November 4, 2010 || Mount Lemmon || Mount Lemmon Survey ||  || align=right data-sort-value="0.65" | 650 m || 
|-id=640 bgcolor=#d6d6d6
| 507640 ||  || — || October 24, 2009 || Mount Lemmon || Mount Lemmon Survey || 3:2 || align=right | 4.1 km || 
|-id=641 bgcolor=#fefefe
| 507641 ||  || — || July 1, 2013 || Haleakala || Pan-STARRS ||  || align=right data-sort-value="0.65" | 650 m || 
|-id=642 bgcolor=#fefefe
| 507642 ||  || — || July 2, 2013 || Haleakala || Pan-STARRS ||  || align=right data-sort-value="0.68" | 680 m || 
|-id=643 bgcolor=#fefefe
| 507643 ||  || — || October 11, 2010 || Mount Lemmon || Mount Lemmon Survey ||  || align=right data-sort-value="0.73" | 730 m || 
|-id=644 bgcolor=#fefefe
| 507644 ||  || — || November 2, 2007 || Kitt Peak || Spacewatch ||  || align=right data-sort-value="0.71" | 710 m || 
|-id=645 bgcolor=#fefefe
| 507645 ||  || — || September 20, 2006 || Catalina || CSS ||  || align=right data-sort-value="0.68" | 680 m || 
|-id=646 bgcolor=#fefefe
| 507646 ||  || — || January 19, 2012 || Haleakala || Pan-STARRS || V || align=right data-sort-value="0.47" | 470 m || 
|-id=647 bgcolor=#E9E9E9
| 507647 ||  || — || September 9, 2004 || Socorro || LINEAR ||  || align=right | 1.4 km || 
|-id=648 bgcolor=#fefefe
| 507648 ||  || — || September 15, 2010 || Mount Lemmon || Mount Lemmon Survey ||  || align=right data-sort-value="0.65" | 650 m || 
|-id=649 bgcolor=#fefefe
| 507649 ||  || — || November 3, 2010 || Mount Lemmon || Mount Lemmon Survey ||  || align=right data-sort-value="0.68" | 680 m || 
|-id=650 bgcolor=#fefefe
| 507650 ||  || — || April 22, 2009 || Mount Lemmon || Mount Lemmon Survey ||  || align=right data-sort-value="0.55" | 550 m || 
|-id=651 bgcolor=#fefefe
| 507651 ||  || — || February 25, 2012 || Mount Lemmon || Mount Lemmon Survey ||  || align=right data-sort-value="0.73" | 730 m || 
|-id=652 bgcolor=#fefefe
| 507652 ||  || — || January 3, 2012 || Mount Lemmon || Mount Lemmon Survey ||  || align=right data-sort-value="0.75" | 750 m || 
|-id=653 bgcolor=#fefefe
| 507653 ||  || — || August 9, 2013 || Kitt Peak || Spacewatch ||  || align=right data-sort-value="0.73" | 730 m || 
|-id=654 bgcolor=#fefefe
| 507654 ||  || — || November 1, 2010 || Mount Lemmon || Mount Lemmon Survey ||  || align=right data-sort-value="0.66" | 660 m || 
|-id=655 bgcolor=#fefefe
| 507655 ||  || — || July 16, 2013 || Haleakala || Pan-STARRS ||  || align=right data-sort-value="0.76" | 760 m || 
|-id=656 bgcolor=#fefefe
| 507656 ||  || — || October 2, 2003 || Kitt Peak || Spacewatch || BAP || align=right data-sort-value="0.78" | 780 m || 
|-id=657 bgcolor=#fefefe
| 507657 ||  || — || December 13, 2006 || Kitt Peak || Spacewatch || NYS || align=right data-sort-value="0.50" | 500 m || 
|-id=658 bgcolor=#fefefe
| 507658 ||  || — || September 27, 2006 || Mount Lemmon || Mount Lemmon Survey ||  || align=right data-sort-value="0.81" | 810 m || 
|-id=659 bgcolor=#fefefe
| 507659 ||  || — || August 12, 2013 || Kitt Peak || Spacewatch ||  || align=right data-sort-value="0.67" | 670 m || 
|-id=660 bgcolor=#fefefe
| 507660 ||  || — || June 16, 2013 || Mount Lemmon || Mount Lemmon Survey ||  || align=right data-sort-value="0.75" | 750 m || 
|-id=661 bgcolor=#fefefe
| 507661 ||  || — || November 6, 2010 || Kitt Peak || Spacewatch ||  || align=right data-sort-value="0.64" | 640 m || 
|-id=662 bgcolor=#fefefe
| 507662 ||  || — || January 10, 2011 || Mount Lemmon || Mount Lemmon Survey ||  || align=right data-sort-value="0.78" | 780 m || 
|-id=663 bgcolor=#fefefe
| 507663 ||  || — || November 15, 2006 || Kitt Peak || Spacewatch ||  || align=right data-sort-value="0.59" | 590 m || 
|-id=664 bgcolor=#fefefe
| 507664 ||  || — || February 23, 2012 || Mount Lemmon || Mount Lemmon Survey ||  || align=right data-sort-value="0.76" | 760 m || 
|-id=665 bgcolor=#fefefe
| 507665 ||  || — || November 14, 2006 || Kitt Peak || Spacewatch ||  || align=right data-sort-value="0.69" | 690 m || 
|-id=666 bgcolor=#fefefe
| 507666 ||  || — || January 30, 2011 || Haleakala || Pan-STARRS ||  || align=right data-sort-value="0.67" | 670 m || 
|-id=667 bgcolor=#E9E9E9
| 507667 ||  || — || April 14, 2007 || Kitt Peak || Spacewatch || HNS || align=right | 1.2 km || 
|-id=668 bgcolor=#fefefe
| 507668 ||  || — || January 19, 2012 || Haleakala || Pan-STARRS ||  || align=right data-sort-value="0.85" | 850 m || 
|-id=669 bgcolor=#fefefe
| 507669 ||  || — || August 1, 2009 || Kitt Peak || Spacewatch || NYS || align=right data-sort-value="0.45" | 450 m || 
|-id=670 bgcolor=#fefefe
| 507670 ||  || — || September 14, 2013 || Kitt Peak || Spacewatch || CLA || align=right | 1.3 km || 
|-id=671 bgcolor=#fefefe
| 507671 ||  || — || October 24, 1998 || Kitt Peak || Spacewatch ||  || align=right data-sort-value="0.82" | 820 m || 
|-id=672 bgcolor=#E9E9E9
| 507672 ||  || — || September 28, 2009 || Kitt Peak || Spacewatch ||  || align=right data-sort-value="0.78" | 780 m || 
|-id=673 bgcolor=#E9E9E9
| 507673 ||  || — || September 21, 2009 || Mount Lemmon || Mount Lemmon Survey ||  || align=right | 1.2 km || 
|-id=674 bgcolor=#E9E9E9
| 507674 ||  || — || November 25, 2005 || Mount Lemmon || Mount Lemmon Survey ||  || align=right data-sort-value="0.58" | 580 m || 
|-id=675 bgcolor=#fefefe
| 507675 ||  || — || January 30, 2011 || Haleakala || Pan-STARRS ||  || align=right data-sort-value="0.81" | 810 m || 
|-id=676 bgcolor=#fefefe
| 507676 ||  || — || February 13, 2011 || Mount Lemmon || Mount Lemmon Survey || MAS || align=right data-sort-value="0.66" | 660 m || 
|-id=677 bgcolor=#fefefe
| 507677 ||  || — || December 24, 2006 || Kitt Peak || Spacewatch || NYS || align=right data-sort-value="0.70" | 700 m || 
|-id=678 bgcolor=#fefefe
| 507678 ||  || — || April 2, 2005 || Mount Lemmon || Mount Lemmon Survey ||  || align=right data-sort-value="0.63" | 630 m || 
|-id=679 bgcolor=#E9E9E9
| 507679 ||  || — || November 17, 2009 || Catalina || CSS ||  || align=right data-sort-value="0.92" | 920 m || 
|-id=680 bgcolor=#fefefe
| 507680 ||  || — || January 30, 2011 || Kitt Peak || Spacewatch || NYS || align=right data-sort-value="0.66" | 660 m || 
|-id=681 bgcolor=#fefefe
| 507681 ||  || — || November 22, 2006 || Kitt Peak || Spacewatch ||  || align=right data-sort-value="0.71" | 710 m || 
|-id=682 bgcolor=#fefefe
| 507682 ||  || — || September 1, 2013 || Mount Lemmon || Mount Lemmon Survey ||  || align=right data-sort-value="0.66" | 660 m || 
|-id=683 bgcolor=#fefefe
| 507683 ||  || — || January 30, 2011 || Haleakala || Pan-STARRS ||  || align=right data-sort-value="0.65" | 650 m || 
|-id=684 bgcolor=#fefefe
| 507684 ||  || — || September 9, 2013 || Haleakala || Pan-STARRS ||  || align=right data-sort-value="0.68" | 680 m || 
|-id=685 bgcolor=#fefefe
| 507685 ||  || — || September 15, 2006 || Kitt Peak || Spacewatch ||  || align=right data-sort-value="0.68" | 680 m || 
|-id=686 bgcolor=#E9E9E9
| 507686 ||  || — || March 9, 2011 || Mount Lemmon || Mount Lemmon Survey || HNS || align=right | 1.2 km || 
|-id=687 bgcolor=#fefefe
| 507687 ||  || — || December 24, 2006 || Catalina || CSS ||  || align=right data-sort-value="0.78" | 780 m || 
|-id=688 bgcolor=#fefefe
| 507688 ||  || — || January 14, 2011 || Mount Lemmon || Mount Lemmon Survey ||  || align=right data-sort-value="0.83" | 830 m || 
|-id=689 bgcolor=#E9E9E9
| 507689 ||  || — || September 26, 2013 || Mount Lemmon || Mount Lemmon Survey ||  || align=right data-sort-value="0.77" | 770 m || 
|-id=690 bgcolor=#fefefe
| 507690 ||  || — || March 27, 2008 || Kitt Peak || Spacewatch ||  || align=right data-sort-value="0.97" | 970 m || 
|-id=691 bgcolor=#E9E9E9
| 507691 ||  || — || October 1, 2013 || Kitt Peak || Spacewatch ||  || align=right | 1.3 km || 
|-id=692 bgcolor=#fefefe
| 507692 ||  || — || March 28, 2008 || Mount Lemmon || Mount Lemmon Survey || V || align=right data-sort-value="0.52" | 520 m || 
|-id=693 bgcolor=#fefefe
| 507693 ||  || — || July 28, 2009 || Kitt Peak || Spacewatch || NYS || align=right data-sort-value="0.59" | 590 m || 
|-id=694 bgcolor=#fefefe
| 507694 ||  || — || August 1, 2009 || Kitt Peak || Spacewatch ||  || align=right data-sort-value="0.70" | 700 m || 
|-id=695 bgcolor=#fefefe
| 507695 ||  || — || August 27, 2009 || Catalina || CSS ||  || align=right data-sort-value="0.86" | 860 m || 
|-id=696 bgcolor=#fefefe
| 507696 ||  || — || April 14, 2012 || Haleakala || Pan-STARRS || MAS || align=right data-sort-value="0.60" | 600 m || 
|-id=697 bgcolor=#fefefe
| 507697 ||  || — || September 17, 2009 || Kitt Peak || Spacewatch ||  || align=right data-sort-value="0.83" | 830 m || 
|-id=698 bgcolor=#fefefe
| 507698 ||  || — || September 17, 2009 || Kitt Peak || Spacewatch || MAS || align=right data-sort-value="0.56" | 560 m || 
|-id=699 bgcolor=#fefefe
| 507699 ||  || — || January 1, 2012 || Mount Lemmon || Mount Lemmon Survey ||  || align=right data-sort-value="0.79" | 790 m || 
|-id=700 bgcolor=#fefefe
| 507700 ||  || — || July 27, 2009 || Kitt Peak || Spacewatch ||  || align=right data-sort-value="0.70" | 700 m || 
|}

507701–507800 

|-bgcolor=#fefefe
| 507701 ||  || — || August 18, 2009 || Kitt Peak || Spacewatch ||  || align=right data-sort-value="0.60" | 600 m || 
|-id=702 bgcolor=#fefefe
| 507702 ||  || — || August 17, 2009 || Kitt Peak || Spacewatch ||  || align=right data-sort-value="0.71" | 710 m || 
|-id=703 bgcolor=#fefefe
| 507703 ||  || — || September 19, 2006 || Kitt Peak || Spacewatch ||  || align=right data-sort-value="0.71" | 710 m || 
|-id=704 bgcolor=#E9E9E9
| 507704 ||  || — || October 1, 2013 || Kitt Peak || Spacewatch ||  || align=right | 2.2 km || 
|-id=705 bgcolor=#E9E9E9
| 507705 ||  || — || September 19, 2009 || Mount Lemmon || Mount Lemmon Survey ||  || align=right data-sort-value="0.76" | 760 m || 
|-id=706 bgcolor=#fefefe
| 507706 ||  || — || August 18, 2009 || Kitt Peak || Spacewatch || MAS || align=right data-sort-value="0.63" | 630 m || 
|-id=707 bgcolor=#E9E9E9
| 507707 ||  || — || April 22, 2007 || Kitt Peak || Spacewatch ||  || align=right | 1.9 km || 
|-id=708 bgcolor=#E9E9E9
| 507708 ||  || — || February 27, 2012 || Haleakala || Pan-STARRS ||  || align=right | 1.7 km || 
|-id=709 bgcolor=#fefefe
| 507709 ||  || — || November 12, 2006 || Catalina || CSS ||  || align=right data-sort-value="0.85" | 850 m || 
|-id=710 bgcolor=#E9E9E9
| 507710 ||  || — || March 16, 2012 || Haleakala || Pan-STARRS || BAR || align=right | 1.1 km || 
|-id=711 bgcolor=#fefefe
| 507711 ||  || — || September 3, 2013 || Mount Lemmon || Mount Lemmon Survey ||  || align=right data-sort-value="0.61" | 610 m || 
|-id=712 bgcolor=#fefefe
| 507712 ||  || — || March 4, 2011 || Mount Lemmon || Mount Lemmon Survey ||  || align=right data-sort-value="0.64" | 640 m || 
|-id=713 bgcolor=#E9E9E9
| 507713 ||  || — || March 29, 2003 || Anderson Mesa || LONEOS ||  || align=right | 1.3 km || 
|-id=714 bgcolor=#E9E9E9
| 507714 ||  || — || June 11, 2004 || Kitt Peak || Spacewatch ||  || align=right | 1.5 km || 
|-id=715 bgcolor=#fefefe
| 507715 ||  || — || February 23, 2007 || Mount Lemmon || Mount Lemmon Survey ||  || align=right data-sort-value="0.59" | 590 m || 
|-id=716 bgcolor=#FFC2E0
| 507716 ||  || — || October 25, 2013 || Haleakala || Pan-STARRS || APO +1kmPHA || align=right | 1.9 km || 
|-id=717 bgcolor=#fefefe
| 507717 ||  || — || March 30, 2011 || Mount Lemmon || Mount Lemmon Survey ||  || align=right data-sort-value="0.67" | 670 m || 
|-id=718 bgcolor=#E9E9E9
| 507718 ||  || — || July 14, 2004 || Siding Spring || SSS ||  || align=right | 1.4 km || 
|-id=719 bgcolor=#E9E9E9
| 507719 ||  || — || March 11, 2011 || Mount Lemmon || Mount Lemmon Survey ||  || align=right | 1.0 km || 
|-id=720 bgcolor=#E9E9E9
| 507720 ||  || — || November 4, 2004 || Catalina || CSS ||  || align=right | 3.0 km || 
|-id=721 bgcolor=#E9E9E9
| 507721 ||  || — || July 13, 2013 || Haleakala || Pan-STARRS ||  || align=right | 2.1 km || 
|-id=722 bgcolor=#fefefe
| 507722 ||  || — || October 14, 2013 || Kitt Peak || Spacewatch ||  || align=right data-sort-value="0.85" | 850 m || 
|-id=723 bgcolor=#E9E9E9
| 507723 ||  || — || July 14, 2013 || Haleakala || Pan-STARRS ||  || align=right data-sort-value="0.99" | 990 m || 
|-id=724 bgcolor=#E9E9E9
| 507724 ||  || — || December 28, 2005 || Kitt Peak || Spacewatch ||  || align=right data-sort-value="0.85" | 850 m || 
|-id=725 bgcolor=#E9E9E9
| 507725 ||  || — || November 12, 2013 || Mount Lemmon || Mount Lemmon Survey ||  || align=right | 2.8 km || 
|-id=726 bgcolor=#E9E9E9
| 507726 ||  || — || September 7, 2004 || Kitt Peak || Spacewatch ||  || align=right | 1.0 km || 
|-id=727 bgcolor=#E9E9E9
| 507727 ||  || — || January 12, 2010 || Catalina || CSS ||  || align=right | 2.3 km || 
|-id=728 bgcolor=#E9E9E9
| 507728 ||  || — || July 14, 2013 || Haleakala || Pan-STARRS || WAT || align=right | 1.8 km || 
|-id=729 bgcolor=#E9E9E9
| 507729 ||  || — || October 28, 2013 || Mount Lemmon || Mount Lemmon Survey ||  || align=right | 1.2 km || 
|-id=730 bgcolor=#E9E9E9
| 507730 ||  || — || April 3, 2011 || Haleakala || Pan-STARRS ||  || align=right | 1.6 km || 
|-id=731 bgcolor=#E9E9E9
| 507731 ||  || — || November 2, 2013 || Catalina || CSS || BAR || align=right | 1.0 km || 
|-id=732 bgcolor=#E9E9E9
| 507732 ||  || — || September 12, 2013 || Mount Lemmon || Mount Lemmon Survey ||  || align=right data-sort-value="0.86" | 860 m || 
|-id=733 bgcolor=#fefefe
| 507733 ||  || — || September 28, 2009 || Mount Lemmon || Mount Lemmon Survey || V || align=right data-sort-value="0.71" | 710 m || 
|-id=734 bgcolor=#E9E9E9
| 507734 ||  || — || November 9, 2009 || Kitt Peak || Spacewatch ||  || align=right data-sort-value="0.67" | 670 m || 
|-id=735 bgcolor=#E9E9E9
| 507735 ||  || — || November 28, 2013 || Mount Lemmon || Mount Lemmon Survey ||  || align=right | 1.0 km || 
|-id=736 bgcolor=#E9E9E9
| 507736 ||  || — || November 25, 2013 || Haleakala || Pan-STARRS ||  || align=right | 2.7 km || 
|-id=737 bgcolor=#E9E9E9
| 507737 ||  || — || November 28, 2013 || Kitt Peak || Spacewatch ||  || align=right | 2.8 km || 
|-id=738 bgcolor=#E9E9E9
| 507738 ||  || — || January 24, 2006 || Catalina || CSS ||  || align=right | 1.3 km || 
|-id=739 bgcolor=#E9E9E9
| 507739 ||  || — || November 1, 2013 || Kitt Peak || Spacewatch ||  || align=right | 2.0 km || 
|-id=740 bgcolor=#E9E9E9
| 507740 ||  || — || October 6, 1996 || Kitt Peak || Spacewatch ||  || align=right data-sort-value="0.85" | 850 m || 
|-id=741 bgcolor=#E9E9E9
| 507741 ||  || — || December 4, 2005 || Kitt Peak || Spacewatch ||  || align=right data-sort-value="0.80" | 800 m || 
|-id=742 bgcolor=#E9E9E9
| 507742 ||  || — || November 12, 2013 || Mount Lemmon || Mount Lemmon Survey ||  || align=right | 1.3 km || 
|-id=743 bgcolor=#d6d6d6
| 507743 ||  || — || November 24, 2003 || Kitt Peak || Spacewatch || BRA || align=right | 1.4 km || 
|-id=744 bgcolor=#E9E9E9
| 507744 ||  || — || February 15, 2010 || Catalina || CSS ||  || align=right | 1.6 km || 
|-id=745 bgcolor=#E9E9E9
| 507745 ||  || — || December 24, 2013 || Mount Lemmon || Mount Lemmon Survey ||  || align=right | 1.8 km || 
|-id=746 bgcolor=#E9E9E9
| 507746 ||  || — || April 2, 2006 || Kitt Peak || Spacewatch ||  || align=right | 1.4 km || 
|-id=747 bgcolor=#E9E9E9
| 507747 ||  || — || January 10, 2010 || Mount Lemmon || Mount Lemmon Survey || KON || align=right | 2.0 km || 
|-id=748 bgcolor=#E9E9E9
| 507748 ||  || — || November 28, 2013 || Mount Lemmon || Mount Lemmon Survey ||  || align=right | 1.0 km || 
|-id=749 bgcolor=#E9E9E9
| 507749 ||  || — || December 24, 2013 || Mount Lemmon || Mount Lemmon Survey ||  || align=right | 1.5 km || 
|-id=750 bgcolor=#d6d6d6
| 507750 ||  || — || October 7, 2012 || Haleakala || Pan-STARRS ||  || align=right | 3.1 km || 
|-id=751 bgcolor=#d6d6d6
| 507751 ||  || — || December 26, 2013 || Mount Lemmon || Mount Lemmon Survey || 7:4 || align=right | 4.1 km || 
|-id=752 bgcolor=#E9E9E9
| 507752 ||  || — || April 26, 2006 || Kitt Peak || Spacewatch ||  || align=right | 1.4 km || 
|-id=753 bgcolor=#E9E9E9
| 507753 ||  || — || January 20, 2009 || Mount Lemmon || Mount Lemmon Survey ||  || align=right | 1.8 km || 
|-id=754 bgcolor=#E9E9E9
| 507754 ||  || — || October 9, 2008 || Kitt Peak || Spacewatch ||  || align=right | 1.0 km || 
|-id=755 bgcolor=#E9E9E9
| 507755 ||  || — || November 28, 2013 || Mount Lemmon || Mount Lemmon Survey ||  || align=right | 2.1 km || 
|-id=756 bgcolor=#E9E9E9
| 507756 ||  || — || November 9, 2013 || Mount Lemmon || Mount Lemmon Survey ||  || align=right | 1.9 km || 
|-id=757 bgcolor=#E9E9E9
| 507757 ||  || — || December 25, 2013 || Mount Lemmon || Mount Lemmon Survey ||  || align=right | 1.6 km || 
|-id=758 bgcolor=#E9E9E9
| 507758 ||  || — || May 25, 2010 || WISE || WISE ||  || align=right | 1.4 km || 
|-id=759 bgcolor=#d6d6d6
| 507759 ||  || — || November 28, 2013 || Mount Lemmon || Mount Lemmon Survey ||  || align=right | 2.0 km || 
|-id=760 bgcolor=#E9E9E9
| 507760 ||  || — || November 12, 2013 || Mount Lemmon || Mount Lemmon Survey ||  || align=right data-sort-value="0.81" | 810 m || 
|-id=761 bgcolor=#E9E9E9
| 507761 ||  || — || November 11, 2004 || Kitt Peak || Spacewatch ||  || align=right | 1.2 km || 
|-id=762 bgcolor=#E9E9E9
| 507762 ||  || — || October 15, 2012 || Haleakala || Pan-STARRS || HOF || align=right | 2.8 km || 
|-id=763 bgcolor=#E9E9E9
| 507763 ||  || — || November 21, 2009 || Kitt Peak || Spacewatch ||  || align=right | 1.5 km || 
|-id=764 bgcolor=#d6d6d6
| 507764 ||  || — || May 8, 2006 || Mount Lemmon || Mount Lemmon Survey ||  || align=right | 2.8 km || 
|-id=765 bgcolor=#E9E9E9
| 507765 ||  || — || September 22, 2008 || Kitt Peak || Spacewatch ||  || align=right | 1.4 km || 
|-id=766 bgcolor=#E9E9E9
| 507766 ||  || — || December 26, 2013 || Mount Lemmon || Mount Lemmon Survey || AGN || align=right | 1.1 km || 
|-id=767 bgcolor=#d6d6d6
| 507767 ||  || — || September 14, 2007 || Kitt Peak || Spacewatch ||  || align=right | 2.7 km || 
|-id=768 bgcolor=#E9E9E9
| 507768 ||  || — || December 11, 2013 || Haleakala || Pan-STARRS ||  || align=right | 1.9 km || 
|-id=769 bgcolor=#E9E9E9
| 507769 ||  || — || December 11, 2004 || Kitt Peak || Spacewatch || EUN || align=right | 1.1 km || 
|-id=770 bgcolor=#E9E9E9
| 507770 ||  || — || January 21, 2006 || Kitt Peak || Spacewatch ||  || align=right | 1.3 km || 
|-id=771 bgcolor=#E9E9E9
| 507771 ||  || — || December 24, 2013 || Mount Lemmon || Mount Lemmon Survey ||  || align=right | 1.6 km || 
|-id=772 bgcolor=#E9E9E9
| 507772 ||  || — || December 11, 2013 || Mount Lemmon || Mount Lemmon Survey ||  || align=right | 1.9 km || 
|-id=773 bgcolor=#d6d6d6
| 507773 ||  || — || December 30, 2013 || Mount Lemmon || Mount Lemmon Survey ||  || align=right | 2.8 km || 
|-id=774 bgcolor=#E9E9E9
| 507774 ||  || — || December 24, 2013 || Mount Lemmon || Mount Lemmon Survey ||  || align=right | 1.7 km || 
|-id=775 bgcolor=#E9E9E9
| 507775 ||  || — || December 31, 2013 || Mount Lemmon || Mount Lemmon Survey ||  || align=right | 2.3 km || 
|-id=776 bgcolor=#E9E9E9
| 507776 ||  || — || March 16, 2010 || Mount Lemmon || Mount Lemmon Survey ||  || align=right | 1.9 km || 
|-id=777 bgcolor=#d6d6d6
| 507777 ||  || — || September 4, 2007 || Mount Lemmon || Mount Lemmon Survey ||  || align=right | 1.9 km || 
|-id=778 bgcolor=#E9E9E9
| 507778 ||  || — || October 1, 2008 || Kitt Peak || Spacewatch ||  || align=right | 1.2 km || 
|-id=779 bgcolor=#E9E9E9
| 507779 ||  || — || September 25, 2012 || Mount Lemmon || Mount Lemmon Survey ||  || align=right | 1.6 km || 
|-id=780 bgcolor=#E9E9E9
| 507780 ||  || — || December 11, 2004 || Kitt Peak || Spacewatch ||  || align=right | 1.7 km || 
|-id=781 bgcolor=#E9E9E9
| 507781 ||  || — || April 19, 2010 || WISE || WISE ||  || align=right | 2.5 km || 
|-id=782 bgcolor=#d6d6d6
| 507782 ||  || — || January 1, 2014 || Haleakala || Pan-STARRS ||  || align=right | 2.1 km || 
|-id=783 bgcolor=#d6d6d6
| 507783 ||  || — || January 3, 2014 || Mount Lemmon || Mount Lemmon Survey ||  || align=right | 1.8 km || 
|-id=784 bgcolor=#E9E9E9
| 507784 ||  || — || January 19, 2010 || WISE || WISE ||  || align=right | 2.0 km || 
|-id=785 bgcolor=#E9E9E9
| 507785 ||  || — || January 10, 2014 || Catalina || CSS ||  || align=right | 1.3 km || 
|-id=786 bgcolor=#d6d6d6
| 507786 ||  || — || April 22, 2010 || WISE || WISE ||  || align=right | 3.3 km || 
|-id=787 bgcolor=#E9E9E9
| 507787 ||  || — || March 9, 2005 || Mount Lemmon || Mount Lemmon Survey ||  || align=right | 2.1 km || 
|-id=788 bgcolor=#d6d6d6
| 507788 ||  || — || February 19, 2009 || Catalina || CSS ||  || align=right | 3.9 km || 
|-id=789 bgcolor=#E9E9E9
| 507789 ||  || — || October 8, 2008 || Kitt Peak || Spacewatch ||  || align=right | 1.7 km || 
|-id=790 bgcolor=#E9E9E9
| 507790 ||  || — || January 13, 2005 || Kitt Peak || Spacewatch ||  || align=right | 1.6 km || 
|-id=791 bgcolor=#E9E9E9
| 507791 ||  || — || December 30, 2013 || Mount Lemmon || Mount Lemmon Survey ||  || align=right | 1.6 km || 
|-id=792 bgcolor=#E9E9E9
| 507792 ||  || — || March 17, 2010 || Catalina || CSS || JUN || align=right | 1.1 km || 
|-id=793 bgcolor=#E9E9E9
| 507793 ||  || — || January 16, 2005 || Kitt Peak || Spacewatch ||  || align=right | 2.3 km || 
|-id=794 bgcolor=#E9E9E9
| 507794 ||  || — || September 29, 2008 || Kitt Peak || Spacewatch || JUN || align=right data-sort-value="0.90" | 900 m || 
|-id=795 bgcolor=#d6d6d6
| 507795 ||  || — || January 5, 2014 || Haleakala || Pan-STARRS ||  || align=right | 1.7 km || 
|-id=796 bgcolor=#d6d6d6
| 507796 ||  || — || September 4, 2011 || Haleakala || Pan-STARRS ||  || align=right | 2.6 km || 
|-id=797 bgcolor=#d6d6d6
| 507797 ||  || — || January 21, 2014 || Mount Lemmon || Mount Lemmon Survey ||  || align=right | 2.5 km || 
|-id=798 bgcolor=#E9E9E9
| 507798 ||  || — || October 6, 2012 || Haleakala || Pan-STARRS || MAR || align=right | 1.2 km || 
|-id=799 bgcolor=#FA8072
| 507799 ||  || — || September 23, 2000 || Socorro || LINEAR ||  || align=right | 1.4 km || 
|-id=800 bgcolor=#E9E9E9
| 507800 ||  || — || April 20, 2010 || Mount Lemmon || Mount Lemmon Survey || MRX || align=right | 1.0 km || 
|}

507801–507900 

|-bgcolor=#E9E9E9
| 507801 ||  || — || November 1, 2008 || Mount Lemmon || Mount Lemmon Survey || MRX || align=right data-sort-value="0.82" | 820 m || 
|-id=802 bgcolor=#E9E9E9
| 507802 ||  || — || March 8, 2005 || Mount Lemmon || Mount Lemmon Survey ||  || align=right | 1.7 km || 
|-id=803 bgcolor=#d6d6d6
| 507803 ||  || — || February 2, 2009 || Kitt Peak || Spacewatch ||  || align=right | 2.4 km || 
|-id=804 bgcolor=#d6d6d6
| 507804 ||  || — || December 30, 2013 || Mount Lemmon || Mount Lemmon Survey ||  || align=right | 3.2 km || 
|-id=805 bgcolor=#E9E9E9
| 507805 ||  || — || February 10, 2014 || Catalina || CSS ||  || align=right | 2.5 km || 
|-id=806 bgcolor=#d6d6d6
| 507806 ||  || — || February 10, 2014 || Haleakala || Pan-STARRS ||  || align=right | 2.8 km || 
|-id=807 bgcolor=#d6d6d6
| 507807 ||  || — || February 10, 2014 || Haleakala || Pan-STARRS ||  || align=right | 2.9 km || 
|-id=808 bgcolor=#E9E9E9
| 507808 ||  || — || February 15, 2010 || Kitt Peak || Spacewatch ||  || align=right | 1.2 km || 
|-id=809 bgcolor=#d6d6d6
| 507809 ||  || — || January 29, 2009 || Mount Lemmon || Mount Lemmon Survey ||  || align=right | 3.5 km || 
|-id=810 bgcolor=#E9E9E9
| 507810 ||  || — || February 15, 2010 || Catalina || CSS ||  || align=right | 2.5 km || 
|-id=811 bgcolor=#d6d6d6
| 507811 ||  || — || January 28, 2014 || Kitt Peak || Spacewatch ||  || align=right | 2.7 km || 
|-id=812 bgcolor=#d6d6d6
| 507812 ||  || — || February 22, 2014 || Kitt Peak || Spacewatch ||  || align=right | 2.2 km || 
|-id=813 bgcolor=#E9E9E9
| 507813 ||  || — || October 5, 2008 || La Sagra || OAM Obs. ||  || align=right | 1.2 km || 
|-id=814 bgcolor=#E9E9E9
| 507814 ||  || — || October 7, 2008 || Mount Lemmon || Mount Lemmon Survey ||  || align=right | 1.4 km || 
|-id=815 bgcolor=#d6d6d6
| 507815 ||  || — || March 16, 2004 || Kitt Peak || Spacewatch ||  || align=right | 2.1 km || 
|-id=816 bgcolor=#d6d6d6
| 507816 ||  || — || February 26, 2014 || Haleakala || Pan-STARRS ||  || align=right | 2.7 km || 
|-id=817 bgcolor=#d6d6d6
| 507817 ||  || — || October 4, 2006 || Mount Lemmon || Mount Lemmon Survey ||  || align=right | 2.6 km || 
|-id=818 bgcolor=#E9E9E9
| 507818 ||  || — || September 6, 2008 || Mount Lemmon || Mount Lemmon Survey ||  || align=right data-sort-value="0.97" | 970 m || 
|-id=819 bgcolor=#d6d6d6
| 507819 ||  || — || February 10, 2014 || Haleakala || Pan-STARRS ||  || align=right | 2.5 km || 
|-id=820 bgcolor=#d6d6d6
| 507820 ||  || — || February 11, 2008 || Mount Lemmon || Mount Lemmon Survey ||  || align=right | 3.1 km || 
|-id=821 bgcolor=#d6d6d6
| 507821 ||  || — || September 4, 2011 || Haleakala || Pan-STARRS || EOS || align=right | 1.8 km || 
|-id=822 bgcolor=#d6d6d6
| 507822 ||  || — || September 18, 2011 || Mount Lemmon || Mount Lemmon Survey ||  || align=right | 2.2 km || 
|-id=823 bgcolor=#d6d6d6
| 507823 ||  || — || February 9, 2014 || Kitt Peak || Spacewatch ||  || align=right | 2.8 km || 
|-id=824 bgcolor=#d6d6d6
| 507824 ||  || — || February 7, 2008 || Mount Lemmon || Mount Lemmon Survey ||  || align=right | 2.5 km || 
|-id=825 bgcolor=#E9E9E9
| 507825 ||  || — || January 13, 2010 || WISE || WISE ||  || align=right | 2.2 km || 
|-id=826 bgcolor=#E9E9E9
| 507826 ||  || — || September 18, 2012 || Mount Lemmon || Mount Lemmon Survey ||  || align=right | 2.4 km || 
|-id=827 bgcolor=#E9E9E9
| 507827 ||  || — || October 9, 2007 || Kitt Peak || Spacewatch ||  || align=right | 1.7 km || 
|-id=828 bgcolor=#d6d6d6
| 507828 ||  || — || December 4, 2007 || Kitt Peak || Spacewatch ||  || align=right | 3.0 km || 
|-id=829 bgcolor=#d6d6d6
| 507829 ||  || — || February 9, 2014 || Haleakala || Pan-STARRS ||  || align=right | 3.2 km || 
|-id=830 bgcolor=#d6d6d6
| 507830 ||  || — || March 18, 2009 || Kitt Peak || Spacewatch ||  || align=right | 2.2 km || 
|-id=831 bgcolor=#d6d6d6
| 507831 ||  || — || February 26, 2014 || Haleakala || Pan-STARRS ||  || align=right | 2.5 km || 
|-id=832 bgcolor=#d6d6d6
| 507832 ||  || — || February 9, 2014 || Mount Lemmon || Mount Lemmon Survey || EUP || align=right | 4.1 km || 
|-id=833 bgcolor=#d6d6d6
| 507833 ||  || — || October 24, 2011 || Haleakala || Pan-STARRS || THB || align=right | 3.8 km || 
|-id=834 bgcolor=#C2FFFF
| 507834 ||  || — || December 2, 2010 || Kitt Peak || Spacewatch || L4 || align=right | 8.5 km || 
|-id=835 bgcolor=#d6d6d6
| 507835 ||  || — || February 17, 2004 || Kitt Peak || Spacewatch ||  || align=right | 2.1 km || 
|-id=836 bgcolor=#E9E9E9
| 507836 ||  || — || October 18, 2012 || Haleakala || Pan-STARRS ||  || align=right | 1.6 km || 
|-id=837 bgcolor=#d6d6d6
| 507837 ||  || — || February 28, 2014 || Mount Lemmon || Mount Lemmon Survey ||  || align=right | 3.0 km || 
|-id=838 bgcolor=#E9E9E9
| 507838 ||  || — || April 24, 2006 || Kitt Peak || Spacewatch ||  || align=right | 1.9 km || 
|-id=839 bgcolor=#E9E9E9
| 507839 ||  || — || December 4, 2013 || Haleakala || Pan-STARRS ||  || align=right | 2.1 km || 
|-id=840 bgcolor=#d6d6d6
| 507840 ||  || — || March 8, 2014 || Mount Lemmon || Mount Lemmon Survey ||  || align=right | 2.8 km || 
|-id=841 bgcolor=#d6d6d6
| 507841 ||  || — || August 30, 2011 || Haleakala || Pan-STARRS ||  || align=right | 2.2 km || 
|-id=842 bgcolor=#d6d6d6
| 507842 ||  || — || August 20, 2011 || Haleakala || Pan-STARRS ||  || align=right | 3.4 km || 
|-id=843 bgcolor=#d6d6d6
| 507843 ||  || — || December 30, 2007 || Mount Lemmon || Mount Lemmon Survey || HYG || align=right | 2.8 km || 
|-id=844 bgcolor=#d6d6d6
| 507844 ||  || — || November 18, 2007 || Mount Lemmon || Mount Lemmon Survey ||  || align=right | 2.9 km || 
|-id=845 bgcolor=#d6d6d6
| 507845 ||  || — || October 25, 2011 || Haleakala || Pan-STARRS ||  || align=right | 3.5 km || 
|-id=846 bgcolor=#d6d6d6
| 507846 ||  || — || October 7, 2005 || Mount Lemmon || Mount Lemmon Survey ||  || align=right | 3.2 km || 
|-id=847 bgcolor=#FFC2E0
| 507847 ||  || — || May 31, 2006 || Mount Lemmon || Mount Lemmon Survey || AMO +1km || align=right | 1.2 km || 
|-id=848 bgcolor=#d6d6d6
| 507848 ||  || — || March 27, 2003 || Kitt Peak || Spacewatch ||  || align=right | 3.3 km || 
|-id=849 bgcolor=#d6d6d6
| 507849 ||  || — || September 24, 2011 || Mount Lemmon || Mount Lemmon Survey ||  || align=right | 2.7 km || 
|-id=850 bgcolor=#d6d6d6
| 507850 ||  || — || February 28, 2014 || Haleakala || Pan-STARRS ||  || align=right | 2.1 km || 
|-id=851 bgcolor=#d6d6d6
| 507851 ||  || — || February 26, 2014 || Mount Lemmon || Mount Lemmon Survey ||  || align=right | 3.2 km || 
|-id=852 bgcolor=#d6d6d6
| 507852 ||  || — || February 10, 2014 || Haleakala || Pan-STARRS ||  || align=right | 2.5 km || 
|-id=853 bgcolor=#d6d6d6
| 507853 ||  || — || October 26, 2011 || Haleakala || Pan-STARRS || URS || align=right | 4.2 km || 
|-id=854 bgcolor=#d6d6d6
| 507854 ||  || — || April 20, 2014 || Mount Lemmon || Mount Lemmon Survey ||  || align=right | 2.5 km || 
|-id=855 bgcolor=#d6d6d6
| 507855 ||  || — || March 10, 2003 || Kitt Peak || Spacewatch ||  || align=right | 3.7 km || 
|-id=856 bgcolor=#d6d6d6
| 507856 ||  || — || March 9, 2008 || Mount Lemmon || Mount Lemmon Survey ||  || align=right | 2.2 km || 
|-id=857 bgcolor=#d6d6d6
| 507857 ||  || — || October 19, 2010 || Mount Lemmon || Mount Lemmon Survey || 7:4 || align=right | 3.7 km || 
|-id=858 bgcolor=#d6d6d6
| 507858 ||  || — || October 7, 2005 || Mount Lemmon || Mount Lemmon Survey ||  || align=right | 2.5 km || 
|-id=859 bgcolor=#d6d6d6
| 507859 ||  || — || February 26, 2014 || Haleakala || Pan-STARRS ||  || align=right | 2.0 km || 
|-id=860 bgcolor=#d6d6d6
| 507860 ||  || — || February 28, 2014 || Haleakala || Pan-STARRS ||  || align=right | 3.2 km || 
|-id=861 bgcolor=#d6d6d6
| 507861 ||  || — || October 19, 2011 || Mount Lemmon || Mount Lemmon Survey ||  || align=right | 3.4 km || 
|-id=862 bgcolor=#d6d6d6
| 507862 ||  || — || October 17, 2011 || Kitt Peak || Spacewatch ||  || align=right | 3.4 km || 
|-id=863 bgcolor=#d6d6d6
| 507863 ||  || — || February 8, 2013 || Haleakala || Pan-STARRS ||  || align=right | 3.2 km || 
|-id=864 bgcolor=#d6d6d6
| 507864 ||  || — || October 21, 2006 || Mount Lemmon || Mount Lemmon Survey ||  || align=right | 2.8 km || 
|-id=865 bgcolor=#d6d6d6
| 507865 ||  || — || December 13, 2012 || Mount Lemmon || Mount Lemmon Survey ||  || align=right | 3.9 km || 
|-id=866 bgcolor=#d6d6d6
| 507866 ||  || — || April 14, 2008 || Mount Lemmon || Mount Lemmon Survey ||  || align=right | 2.6 km || 
|-id=867 bgcolor=#fefefe
| 507867 ||  || — || December 4, 2005 || Kitt Peak || Spacewatch || H || align=right data-sort-value="0.54" | 540 m || 
|-id=868 bgcolor=#d6d6d6
| 507868 ||  || — || November 17, 2011 || Kitt Peak || Spacewatch ||  || align=right | 3.0 km || 
|-id=869 bgcolor=#d6d6d6
| 507869 ||  || — || September 27, 2011 || Mount Lemmon || Mount Lemmon Survey ||  || align=right | 3.9 km || 
|-id=870 bgcolor=#fefefe
| 507870 ||  || — || September 18, 2012 || Mount Lemmon || Mount Lemmon Survey || H || align=right data-sort-value="0.53" | 530 m || 
|-id=871 bgcolor=#d6d6d6
| 507871 ||  || — || March 5, 2013 || Mount Lemmon || Mount Lemmon Survey ||  || align=right | 3.2 km || 
|-id=872 bgcolor=#E9E9E9
| 507872 ||  || — || September 29, 2011 || Mount Lemmon || Mount Lemmon Survey ||  || align=right | 2.4 km || 
|-id=873 bgcolor=#d6d6d6
| 507873 ||  || — || April 4, 2003 || Kitt Peak || Spacewatch ||  || align=right | 2.2 km || 
|-id=874 bgcolor=#d6d6d6
| 507874 ||  || — || December 16, 2011 || Mount Lemmon || Mount Lemmon Survey ||  || align=right | 2.7 km || 
|-id=875 bgcolor=#FA8072
| 507875 ||  || — || May 24, 2014 || Haleakala || Pan-STARRS || H || align=right data-sort-value="0.62" | 620 m || 
|-id=876 bgcolor=#d6d6d6
| 507876 ||  || — || May 7, 2014 || Haleakala || Pan-STARRS ||  || align=right | 3.0 km || 
|-id=877 bgcolor=#d6d6d6
| 507877 ||  || — || March 20, 2013 || Haleakala || Pan-STARRS ||  || align=right | 4.0 km || 
|-id=878 bgcolor=#d6d6d6
| 507878 ||  || — || December 26, 2011 || Kitt Peak || Spacewatch ||  || align=right | 4.2 km || 
|-id=879 bgcolor=#fefefe
| 507879 ||  || — || June 26, 2014 || Haleakala || Pan-STARRS || H || align=right data-sort-value="0.91" | 910 m || 
|-id=880 bgcolor=#E9E9E9
| 507880 ||  || — || March 8, 2005 || Catalina || CSS ||  || align=right | 3.1 km || 
|-id=881 bgcolor=#fefefe
| 507881 ||  || — || June 27, 2014 || Haleakala || Pan-STARRS || H || align=right data-sort-value="0.54" | 540 m || 
|-id=882 bgcolor=#fefefe
| 507882 ||  || — || June 3, 2014 || Haleakala || Pan-STARRS || H || align=right data-sort-value="0.67" | 670 m || 
|-id=883 bgcolor=#fefefe
| 507883 ||  || — || July 27, 2014 || Haleakala || Pan-STARRS || H || align=right data-sort-value="0.69" | 690 m || 
|-id=884 bgcolor=#fefefe
| 507884 ||  || — || September 23, 2011 || Haleakala || Pan-STARRS ||  || align=right data-sort-value="0.56" | 560 m || 
|-id=885 bgcolor=#fefefe
| 507885 ||  || — || June 27, 2014 || Haleakala || Pan-STARRS || H || align=right data-sort-value="0.58" | 580 m || 
|-id=886 bgcolor=#fefefe
| 507886 ||  || — || January 14, 2013 || Mount Lemmon || Mount Lemmon Survey || H || align=right data-sort-value="0.53" | 530 m || 
|-id=887 bgcolor=#fefefe
| 507887 ||  || — || January 22, 2013 || Mount Lemmon || Mount Lemmon Survey || H || align=right data-sort-value="0.52" | 520 m || 
|-id=888 bgcolor=#fefefe
| 507888 ||  || — || May 7, 2014 || Haleakala || Pan-STARRS || H || align=right data-sort-value="0.67" | 670 m || 
|-id=889 bgcolor=#fefefe
| 507889 ||  || — || August 25, 2014 || Haleakala || Pan-STARRS || H || align=right data-sort-value="0.56" | 560 m || 
|-id=890 bgcolor=#fefefe
| 507890 ||  || — || October 4, 2004 || Kitt Peak || Spacewatch ||  || align=right data-sort-value="0.54" | 540 m || 
|-id=891 bgcolor=#fefefe
| 507891 ||  || — || August 25, 2014 || Haleakala || Pan-STARRS || H || align=right data-sort-value="0.61" | 610 m || 
|-id=892 bgcolor=#fefefe
| 507892 ||  || — || September 6, 2014 || Catalina || CSS || H || align=right data-sort-value="0.91" | 910 m || 
|-id=893 bgcolor=#fefefe
| 507893 ||  || — || September 20, 2014 || Haleakala || Pan-STARRS || H || align=right data-sort-value="0.66" | 660 m || 
|-id=894 bgcolor=#fefefe
| 507894 ||  || — || June 12, 2008 || Kitt Peak || Spacewatch || H || align=right data-sort-value="0.94" | 940 m || 
|-id=895 bgcolor=#fefefe
| 507895 ||  || — || January 17, 2008 || Mount Lemmon || Mount Lemmon Survey || H || align=right data-sort-value="0.57" | 570 m || 
|-id=896 bgcolor=#fefefe
| 507896 ||  || — || September 2, 2014 || Kitt Peak || Spacewatch || H || align=right data-sort-value="0.62" | 620 m || 
|-id=897 bgcolor=#fefefe
| 507897 ||  || — || September 20, 2014 || Haleakala || Pan-STARRS || H || align=right data-sort-value="0.54" | 540 m || 
|-id=898 bgcolor=#fefefe
| 507898 ||  || — || November 25, 2009 || Mount Lemmon || Mount Lemmon Survey || H || align=right data-sort-value="0.63" | 630 m || 
|-id=899 bgcolor=#fefefe
| 507899 ||  || — || September 14, 2014 || Haleakala || Pan-STARRS || H || align=right data-sort-value="0.57" | 570 m || 
|-id=900 bgcolor=#fefefe
| 507900 ||  || — || October 2, 2014 || Haleakala || Pan-STARRS || H || align=right data-sort-value="0.66" | 660 m || 
|}

507901–508000 

|-bgcolor=#fefefe
| 507901 ||  || — || January 20, 2009 || Kitt Peak || Spacewatch ||  || align=right data-sort-value="0.59" | 590 m || 
|-id=902 bgcolor=#fefefe
| 507902 ||  || — || January 2, 2009 || Kitt Peak || Spacewatch ||  || align=right data-sort-value="0.57" | 570 m || 
|-id=903 bgcolor=#fefefe
| 507903 ||  || — || December 3, 2004 || Kitt Peak || Spacewatch ||  || align=right data-sort-value="0.76" | 760 m || 
|-id=904 bgcolor=#fefefe
| 507904 ||  || — || April 5, 2013 || Haleakala || Pan-STARRS ||  || align=right data-sort-value="0.74" | 740 m || 
|-id=905 bgcolor=#fefefe
| 507905 ||  || — || May 15, 2009 || Kitt Peak || Spacewatch ||  || align=right data-sort-value="0.79" | 790 m || 
|-id=906 bgcolor=#fefefe
| 507906 ||  || — || July 5, 2003 || Kitt Peak || Spacewatch || H || align=right data-sort-value="0.86" | 860 m || 
|-id=907 bgcolor=#fefefe
| 507907 ||  || — || October 21, 2014 || Kitt Peak || Spacewatch ||  || align=right data-sort-value="0.82" | 820 m || 
|-id=908 bgcolor=#fefefe
| 507908 ||  || — || December 1, 2008 || Mount Lemmon || Mount Lemmon Survey ||  || align=right data-sort-value="0.49" | 490 m || 
|-id=909 bgcolor=#fefefe
| 507909 ||  || — || November 30, 2003 || Kitt Peak || Spacewatch || H || align=right data-sort-value="0.54" | 540 m || 
|-id=910 bgcolor=#fefefe
| 507910 ||  || — || November 20, 2014 || Catalina || CSS || H || align=right | 1.1 km || 
|-id=911 bgcolor=#fefefe
| 507911 ||  || — || November 12, 2007 || Mount Lemmon || Mount Lemmon Survey ||  || align=right data-sort-value="0.58" | 580 m || 
|-id=912 bgcolor=#fefefe
| 507912 ||  || — || August 29, 2006 || Kitt Peak || Spacewatch ||  || align=right data-sort-value="0.73" | 730 m || 
|-id=913 bgcolor=#fefefe
| 507913 ||  || — || October 18, 2014 || Mount Lemmon || Mount Lemmon Survey ||  || align=right data-sort-value="0.67" | 670 m || 
|-id=914 bgcolor=#fefefe
| 507914 ||  || — || November 17, 2014 || Haleakala || Pan-STARRS ||  || align=right data-sort-value="0.70" | 700 m || 
|-id=915 bgcolor=#E9E9E9
| 507915 ||  || — || January 30, 2011 || Haleakala || Pan-STARRS ||  || align=right | 2.5 km || 
|-id=916 bgcolor=#E9E9E9
| 507916 ||  || — || February 27, 2006 || Catalina || CSS || EUN || align=right | 1.4 km || 
|-id=917 bgcolor=#E9E9E9
| 507917 ||  || — || August 3, 2013 || Haleakala || Pan-STARRS ||  || align=right | 1.1 km || 
|-id=918 bgcolor=#fefefe
| 507918 ||  || — || May 29, 2008 || Kitt Peak || Spacewatch ||  || align=right data-sort-value="0.79" | 790 m || 
|-id=919 bgcolor=#fefefe
| 507919 ||  || — || October 1, 2011 || Mount Lemmon || Mount Lemmon Survey || H || align=right data-sort-value="0.81" | 810 m || 
|-id=920 bgcolor=#fefefe
| 507920 ||  || — || October 3, 2014 || Haleakala || Pan-STARRS || H || align=right data-sort-value="0.81" | 810 m || 
|-id=921 bgcolor=#E9E9E9
| 507921 ||  || — || January 2, 2006 || Mount Lemmon || Mount Lemmon Survey ||  || align=right | 1.6 km || 
|-id=922 bgcolor=#fefefe
| 507922 ||  || — || December 13, 2014 || Haleakala || Pan-STARRS || H || align=right data-sort-value="0.90" | 900 m || 
|-id=923 bgcolor=#fefefe
| 507923 ||  || — || January 1, 2008 || Kitt Peak || Spacewatch ||  || align=right | 1.0 km || 
|-id=924 bgcolor=#fefefe
| 507924 ||  || — || September 15, 2013 || Mount Lemmon || Mount Lemmon Survey ||  || align=right | 1.0 km || 
|-id=925 bgcolor=#fefefe
| 507925 ||  || — || December 1, 2010 || Mount Lemmon || Mount Lemmon Survey ||  || align=right data-sort-value="0.98" | 980 m || 
|-id=926 bgcolor=#fefefe
| 507926 ||  || — || January 19, 2012 || Haleakala || Pan-STARRS ||  || align=right data-sort-value="0.91" | 910 m || 
|-id=927 bgcolor=#fefefe
| 507927 ||  || — || March 4, 2008 || Mount Lemmon || Mount Lemmon Survey ||  || align=right data-sort-value="0.67" | 670 m || 
|-id=928 bgcolor=#fefefe
| 507928 ||  || — || November 26, 2010 || Mount Lemmon || Mount Lemmon Survey ||  || align=right data-sort-value="0.66" | 660 m || 
|-id=929 bgcolor=#E9E9E9
| 507929 ||  || — || January 28, 2011 || Catalina || CSS ||  || align=right | 1.4 km || 
|-id=930 bgcolor=#E9E9E9
| 507930 ||  || — || January 11, 2015 || Haleakala || Pan-STARRS ||  || align=right | 1.1 km || 
|-id=931 bgcolor=#fefefe
| 507931 ||  || — || May 27, 2009 || Mount Lemmon || Mount Lemmon Survey ||  || align=right data-sort-value="0.98" | 980 m || 
|-id=932 bgcolor=#fefefe
| 507932 ||  || — || November 5, 2007 || Kitt Peak || Spacewatch ||  || align=right data-sort-value="0.52" | 520 m || 
|-id=933 bgcolor=#fefefe
| 507933 ||  || — || May 24, 2006 || Mount Lemmon || Mount Lemmon Survey ||  || align=right data-sort-value="0.80" | 800 m || 
|-id=934 bgcolor=#fefefe
| 507934 ||  || — || November 9, 2007 || Kitt Peak || Spacewatch ||  || align=right data-sort-value="0.65" | 650 m || 
|-id=935 bgcolor=#fefefe
| 507935 ||  || — || February 11, 2008 || Mount Lemmon || Mount Lemmon Survey ||  || align=right data-sort-value="0.67" | 670 m || 
|-id=936 bgcolor=#fefefe
| 507936 ||  || — || December 21, 2014 || Haleakala || Pan-STARRS ||  || align=right data-sort-value="0.71" | 710 m || 
|-id=937 bgcolor=#fefefe
| 507937 ||  || — || March 8, 2005 || Kitt Peak || Spacewatch || BAP || align=right data-sort-value="0.76" | 760 m || 
|-id=938 bgcolor=#fefefe
| 507938 ||  || — || September 17, 2010 || Mount Lemmon || Mount Lemmon Survey ||  || align=right data-sort-value="0.58" | 580 m || 
|-id=939 bgcolor=#E9E9E9
| 507939 ||  || — || January 30, 2012 || Haleakala || Pan-STARRS ||  || align=right data-sort-value="0.99" | 990 m || 
|-id=940 bgcolor=#fefefe
| 507940 ||  || — || February 13, 2008 || Mount Lemmon || Mount Lemmon Survey || NYS || align=right data-sort-value="0.62" | 620 m || 
|-id=941 bgcolor=#fefefe
| 507941 ||  || — || September 17, 2004 || Kitt Peak || Spacewatch ||  || align=right data-sort-value="0.49" | 490 m || 
|-id=942 bgcolor=#fefefe
| 507942 ||  || — || December 3, 2010 || Mount Lemmon || Mount Lemmon Survey ||  || align=right data-sort-value="0.82" | 820 m || 
|-id=943 bgcolor=#E9E9E9
| 507943 ||  || — || June 7, 2008 || Catalina || CSS ||  || align=right | 1.2 km || 
|-id=944 bgcolor=#fefefe
| 507944 ||  || — || September 30, 2009 || Mount Lemmon || Mount Lemmon Survey ||  || align=right | 1.1 km || 
|-id=945 bgcolor=#fefefe
| 507945 ||  || — || August 23, 2001 || Anderson Mesa || LONEOS ||  || align=right | 1.1 km || 
|-id=946 bgcolor=#fefefe
| 507946 ||  || — || January 8, 2011 || Mount Lemmon || Mount Lemmon Survey ||  || align=right data-sort-value="0.74" | 740 m || 
|-id=947 bgcolor=#fefefe
| 507947 ||  || — || January 14, 2015 || Haleakala || Pan-STARRS ||  || align=right data-sort-value="0.57" | 570 m || 
|-id=948 bgcolor=#fefefe
| 507948 ||  || — || November 6, 2007 || Mount Lemmon || Mount Lemmon Survey ||  || align=right data-sort-value="0.75" | 750 m || 
|-id=949 bgcolor=#fefefe
| 507949 ||  || — || January 15, 2015 || Haleakala || Pan-STARRS ||  || align=right data-sort-value="0.75" | 750 m || 
|-id=950 bgcolor=#fefefe
| 507950 ||  || — || November 19, 2006 || Kitt Peak || Spacewatch ||  || align=right data-sort-value="0.74" | 740 m || 
|-id=951 bgcolor=#E9E9E9
| 507951 ||  || — || November 29, 2014 || Haleakala || Pan-STARRS ||  || align=right | 1.2 km || 
|-id=952 bgcolor=#fefefe
| 507952 ||  || — || May 16, 2009 || Kitt Peak || Spacewatch ||  || align=right data-sort-value="0.78" | 780 m || 
|-id=953 bgcolor=#fefefe
| 507953 ||  || — || December 31, 1997 || Kitt Peak || Spacewatch ||  || align=right data-sort-value="0.68" | 680 m || 
|-id=954 bgcolor=#fefefe
| 507954 ||  || — || January 19, 2012 || Haleakala || Pan-STARRS ||  || align=right data-sort-value="0.64" | 640 m || 
|-id=955 bgcolor=#fefefe
| 507955 ||  || — || April 15, 2008 || Kitt Peak || Spacewatch ||  || align=right data-sort-value="0.77" | 770 m || 
|-id=956 bgcolor=#fefefe
| 507956 ||  || — || December 13, 2006 || Kitt Peak || Spacewatch ||  || align=right data-sort-value="0.81" | 810 m || 
|-id=957 bgcolor=#fefefe
| 507957 ||  || — || December 11, 2010 || Mount Lemmon || Mount Lemmon Survey ||  || align=right data-sort-value="0.80" | 800 m || 
|-id=958 bgcolor=#E9E9E9
| 507958 ||  || — || October 30, 2005 || Mount Lemmon || Mount Lemmon Survey ||  || align=right data-sort-value="0.97" | 970 m || 
|-id=959 bgcolor=#fefefe
| 507959 ||  || — || November 15, 1998 || Kitt Peak || Spacewatch ||  || align=right data-sort-value="0.71" | 710 m || 
|-id=960 bgcolor=#fefefe
| 507960 ||  || — || November 21, 2014 || Haleakala || Pan-STARRS ||  || align=right data-sort-value="0.58" | 580 m || 
|-id=961 bgcolor=#fefefe
| 507961 ||  || — || January 1, 2008 || Kitt Peak || Spacewatch ||  || align=right data-sort-value="0.54" | 540 m || 
|-id=962 bgcolor=#fefefe
| 507962 ||  || — || January 16, 2008 || Mount Lemmon || Mount Lemmon Survey ||  || align=right data-sort-value="0.66" | 660 m || 
|-id=963 bgcolor=#fefefe
| 507963 ||  || — || March 27, 2008 || Kitt Peak || Spacewatch ||  || align=right data-sort-value="0.66" | 660 m || 
|-id=964 bgcolor=#fefefe
| 507964 ||  || — || January 17, 2015 || Haleakala || Pan-STARRS ||  || align=right data-sort-value="0.86" | 860 m || 
|-id=965 bgcolor=#E9E9E9
| 507965 ||  || — || January 24, 2011 || Mount Lemmon || Mount Lemmon Survey ||  || align=right data-sort-value="0.90" | 900 m || 
|-id=966 bgcolor=#E9E9E9
| 507966 ||  || — || March 9, 2007 || Catalina || CSS ||  || align=right | 1.2 km || 
|-id=967 bgcolor=#fefefe
| 507967 ||  || — || March 12, 2008 || Kitt Peak || Spacewatch ||  || align=right data-sort-value="0.72" | 720 m || 
|-id=968 bgcolor=#fefefe
| 507968 ||  || — || March 11, 2008 || Mount Lemmon || Mount Lemmon Survey ||  || align=right data-sort-value="0.76" | 760 m || 
|-id=969 bgcolor=#fefefe
| 507969 ||  || — || December 6, 2010 || Mount Lemmon || Mount Lemmon Survey ||  || align=right data-sort-value="0.90" | 900 m || 
|-id=970 bgcolor=#fefefe
| 507970 ||  || — || December 18, 2007 || Mount Lemmon || Mount Lemmon Survey ||  || align=right data-sort-value="0.70" | 700 m || 
|-id=971 bgcolor=#fefefe
| 507971 ||  || — || March 31, 2012 || Kitt Peak || Spacewatch ||  || align=right data-sort-value="0.62" | 620 m || 
|-id=972 bgcolor=#fefefe
| 507972 ||  || — || February 28, 2008 || Mount Lemmon || Mount Lemmon Survey ||  || align=right | 1.0 km || 
|-id=973 bgcolor=#fefefe
| 507973 ||  || — || April 1, 2012 || Mount Lemmon || Mount Lemmon Survey ||  || align=right data-sort-value="0.65" | 650 m || 
|-id=974 bgcolor=#fefefe
| 507974 ||  || — || April 5, 2008 || Mount Lemmon || Mount Lemmon Survey ||  || align=right data-sort-value="0.86" | 860 m || 
|-id=975 bgcolor=#fefefe
| 507975 ||  || — || January 13, 2005 || Kitt Peak || Spacewatch ||  || align=right data-sort-value="0.70" | 700 m || 
|-id=976 bgcolor=#fefefe
| 507976 ||  || — || July 13, 2013 || Haleakala || Pan-STARRS ||  || align=right data-sort-value="0.57" | 570 m || 
|-id=977 bgcolor=#E9E9E9
| 507977 ||  || — || January 16, 2015 || Mount Lemmon || Mount Lemmon Survey ||  || align=right | 3.1 km || 
|-id=978 bgcolor=#fefefe
| 507978 ||  || — || January 11, 2008 || Mount Lemmon || Mount Lemmon Survey ||  || align=right data-sort-value="0.94" | 940 m || 
|-id=979 bgcolor=#E9E9E9
| 507979 ||  || — || September 22, 2008 || Kitt Peak || Spacewatch ||  || align=right | 1.9 km || 
|-id=980 bgcolor=#E9E9E9
| 507980 ||  || — || January 16, 2015 || Haleakala || Pan-STARRS ||  || align=right | 1.3 km || 
|-id=981 bgcolor=#fefefe
| 507981 ||  || — || February 26, 2009 || Mount Lemmon || Mount Lemmon Survey ||  || align=right data-sort-value="0.61" | 610 m || 
|-id=982 bgcolor=#fefefe
| 507982 ||  || — || February 3, 2008 || Kitt Peak || Spacewatch ||  || align=right data-sort-value="0.64" | 640 m || 
|-id=983 bgcolor=#fefefe
| 507983 ||  || — || February 3, 2008 || Mount Lemmon || Mount Lemmon Survey ||  || align=right data-sort-value="0.54" | 540 m || 
|-id=984 bgcolor=#E9E9E9
| 507984 ||  || — || March 9, 2007 || Kitt Peak || Spacewatch ||  || align=right | 1.2 km || 
|-id=985 bgcolor=#fefefe
| 507985 ||  || — || November 2, 2010 || Kitt Peak || Spacewatch ||  || align=right data-sort-value="0.83" | 830 m || 
|-id=986 bgcolor=#fefefe
| 507986 ||  || — || November 17, 2007 || Kitt Peak || Spacewatch ||  || align=right data-sort-value="0.80" | 800 m || 
|-id=987 bgcolor=#fefefe
| 507987 ||  || — || March 31, 2008 || Mount Lemmon || Mount Lemmon Survey ||  || align=right data-sort-value="0.83" | 830 m || 
|-id=988 bgcolor=#E9E9E9
| 507988 ||  || — || September 6, 2008 || Mount Lemmon || Mount Lemmon Survey || RAF || align=right data-sort-value="0.95" | 950 m || 
|-id=989 bgcolor=#fefefe
| 507989 ||  || — || April 15, 2012 || Haleakala || Pan-STARRS ||  || align=right data-sort-value="0.54" | 540 m || 
|-id=990 bgcolor=#fefefe
| 507990 ||  || — || February 13, 2008 || Kitt Peak || Spacewatch ||  || align=right data-sort-value="0.62" | 620 m || 
|-id=991 bgcolor=#fefefe
| 507991 ||  || — || July 14, 2013 || Haleakala || Pan-STARRS ||  || align=right data-sort-value="0.67" | 670 m || 
|-id=992 bgcolor=#fefefe
| 507992 ||  || — || February 16, 2004 || Kitt Peak || Spacewatch ||  || align=right data-sort-value="0.96" | 960 m || 
|-id=993 bgcolor=#fefefe
| 507993 ||  || — || August 21, 2006 || Kitt Peak || Spacewatch ||  || align=right data-sort-value="0.76" | 760 m || 
|-id=994 bgcolor=#fefefe
| 507994 ||  || — || January 26, 2011 || Mount Lemmon || Mount Lemmon Survey ||  || align=right data-sort-value="0.84" | 840 m || 
|-id=995 bgcolor=#fefefe
| 507995 ||  || — || December 20, 2007 || Kitt Peak || Spacewatch ||  || align=right data-sort-value="0.67" | 670 m || 
|-id=996 bgcolor=#fefefe
| 507996 ||  || — || March 11, 2005 || Mount Lemmon || Mount Lemmon Survey ||  || align=right data-sort-value="0.64" | 640 m || 
|-id=997 bgcolor=#fefefe
| 507997 ||  || — || October 3, 2010 || Kitt Peak || Spacewatch ||  || align=right data-sort-value="0.62" | 620 m || 
|-id=998 bgcolor=#fefefe
| 507998 ||  || — || December 30, 2007 || Mount Lemmon || Mount Lemmon Survey ||  || align=right data-sort-value="0.65" | 650 m || 
|-id=999 bgcolor=#fefefe
| 507999 ||  || — || March 9, 2005 || Kitt Peak || Spacewatch ||  || align=right data-sort-value="0.71" | 710 m || 
|-id=000 bgcolor=#fefefe
| 508000 ||  || — || March 5, 2008 || Mount Lemmon || Mount Lemmon Survey ||  || align=right data-sort-value="0.79" | 790 m || 
|}

References

External links 
 Discovery Circumstances: Numbered Minor Planets (505001)–(510000) (IAU Minor Planet Center)

0507